= SMS Hansa (1898) =

Protected cruiser of the German Imperial Navy

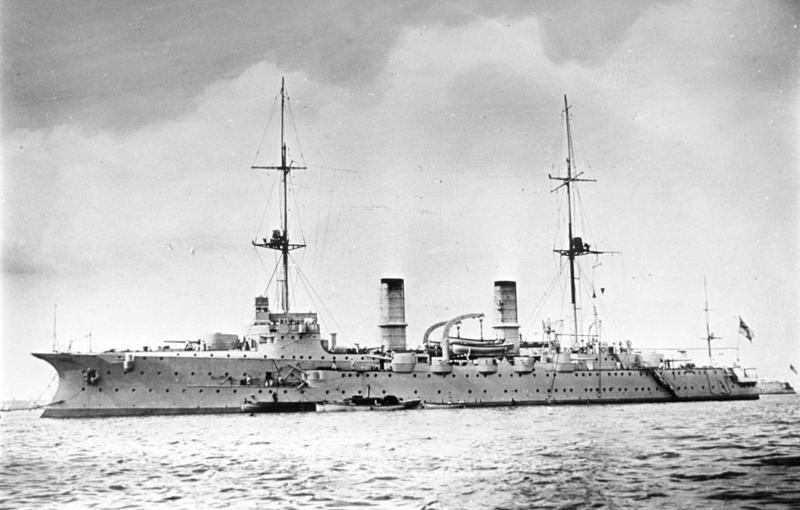
- SMS Hansa after her refit

History

German Empire
- Name: SMS Hansa
- Namesake: Hanseatic League
- Builder: Stettiner Maschinenbau AG Vulcan
- Laid down: 23 July 1896
- Launched: 12 March 1898
- Commissioned: 20 April 1899
- Decommissioned: 16 November 1914
- Stricken: 6 December 1919
- Fate: Scrapped, 1920

General characteristics
- Class & type: Victoria Louise-class cruiser
- Displacement: Normal: 5,885 t (5,792 long tons); Full load: 6,705 t (6,599 long tons)
- Length: 110.5 m (363 ft)
- Beam: 17.6 m (58 ft)
- Draft: 7.08 m (23.2 ft)
- Installed power: 18 × Belleville boilers; 10,000 PS (9,900 ihp)
- Propulsion: 3 × triple-expansion steam engines; 3 × screw propellers
- Speed: 19 knots (35 km/h; 22 mph)
- Range: 3,412 nmi (6,319 km; 3,926 mi) at 12 kn (22 km/h; 14 mph)
- Complement: 31 officers; 446 enlisted men
- Armament: 2 × 21 cm (8.3 in) guns; 8 × 15 cm (5.9 in) guns; 10 × 8.8 cm (3.5 in) guns; 10 × 3.7 cm (1.5 in) Maxim machine cannon; 3 × 45 cm (17.7 in) torpedo tubes
- Armor: Deck: 4 to 10 cm (1.6 to 3.9 in); Turrets: 10 cm; Casemates: 10 cm; Conning tower: 15 cm (5.9 in)

SMS Hansa was a protected cruiser of the Victoria Louise class, built for the German Imperial Navy (Kaiserliche Marine) in the 1890s, along with her sister ships Victoria Louise, Hertha, Vineta, and Freya. Hansa was laid down at the AG Vulcan shipyard in Stettin in 1896, launched in March 1898, and commissioned into the Navy in April 1899. The ship was armed with a battery of two 21 cm guns and eight 15 cm guns and had a top speed of 19 knots (35 km/h; 22 mph). Though the five Victoria Louise-class cruisers proved to be disappointing in some ways, they marked the beginning of a decade of German cruiser construction.

Hansa served abroad in the East Asia Squadron for the first six years of her career, and during the first few years of this deployment, she served as the deputy commander's flagship. She saw action during the Boxer Uprising in Qing China in 1900, contributing a landing party to the force that captured the Taku Forts and the subsequent Seymour Expedition. Over the next four years, she toured the region, visiting numerous ports from Japan to Australia. In August 1904, she participated in the internment of the Russian battleship Tsesarevich after the Battle of the Yellow Sea during the Russo-Japanese War.

After returning to Germany in 1906, she was modernized and used as a training ship in 1909, following the completion of the refit. Over the next few years, she embarked on numerous training cruises, including a major voyage to the Mediterranean Sea in 1909–1910 and another to the United States in 1911–1912. At the outbreak of World War I, Hansa was mobilized into V Scouting Group, serving as its flagship, but she served in front-line duty only briefly. She was used as a barracks ship after 1915, and ultimately sold for scrapping in 1920.

== Design ==
In the early 1890s, elements in the German naval command structure grappled with what type of cruiser ought to be built to fulfill the various needs of the fleet. The Reichsmarineamt (RMA—Imperial Navy Office) preferred to build a combination of large cruisers of around 6,000 t (5,900 long tons) along the lines of SMS Kaiserin Augusta and significantly smaller vessels of about 1,500 t (1,476 long tons) to support them, while the Oberkommando der Marine (Naval High Command) argued that a uniform force of 3,000 t (2,953 long tons) cruisers was preferable. In the event, the RMA carried the day and three 6,000-ton cruisers were authorized in 1895; this was in part due to the intervention of Kaiser Wilhelm II and in part due to comparisons with foreign contemporaries, like the United States' Baltimore and the Austro-Hungarian Kaiserin und Königin Maria Theresia. The experience of Japanese cruisers during the contemporaneous First Sino-Japanese War showed the benefit of larger 21 cm (8.3 in) guns, which were adopted for the main battery of the Victoria Louise class. For the 1896/1897 fiscal year, another pair of ships were authorized, and one of these became Hansa.

They resembled the larger Kaiser Friedrich III-class battleships, designed at the same time, albeit at reduced scale. The new cruisers proved to be unsatisfactory as fleet cruisers, because they were too slow and they lacked sufficient armor protection. They nevertheless provided good service as overseas cruisers and later as training ships. They (along with the contemporaneous armored cruiser Fürst Bismarck) nevertheless marked the beginning of a trend of German cruiser construction that lasted through the Scharnhorst-class cruisers built a decade later.

=== Characteristics ===
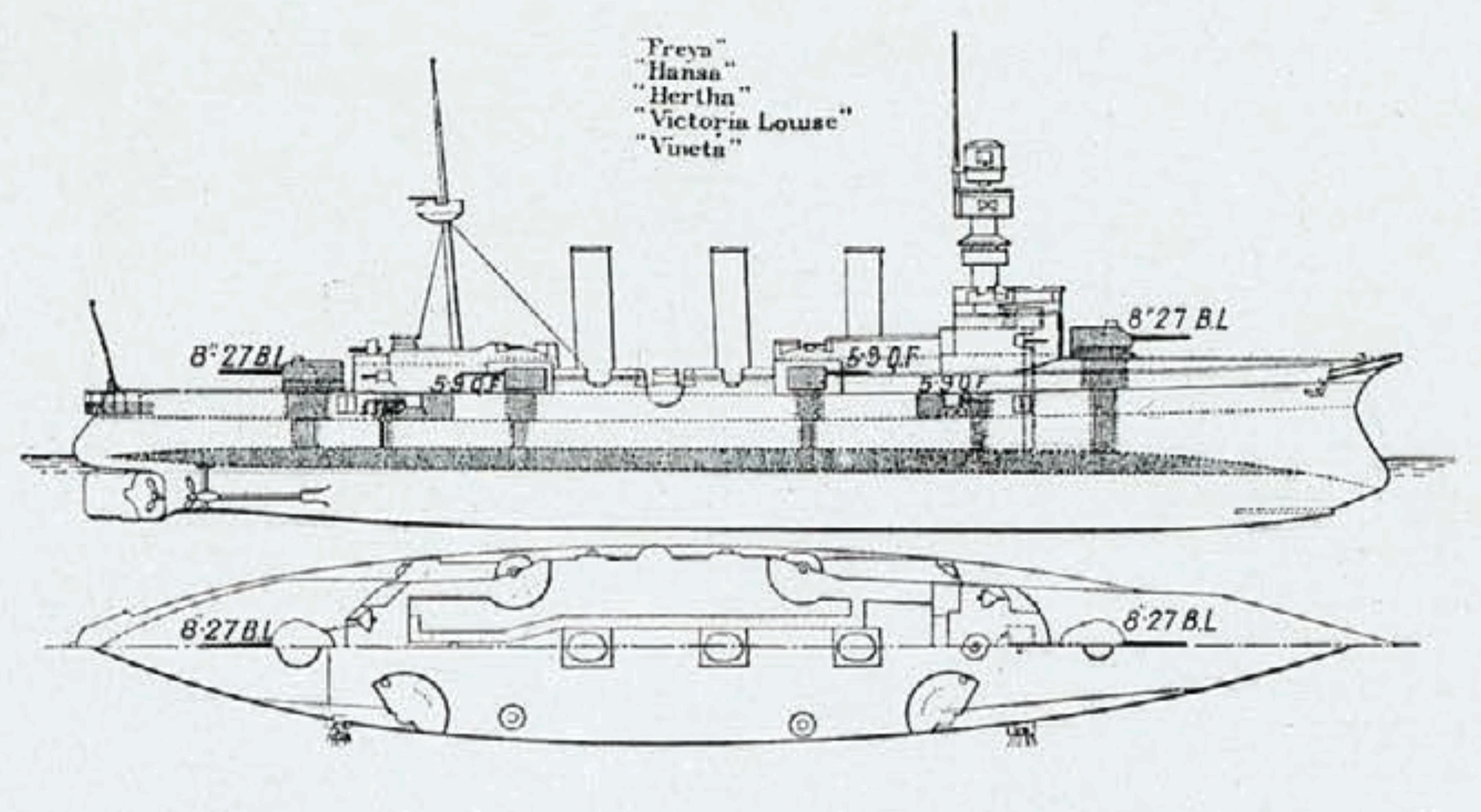
Plan and profile drawing of the Victoria Louise class

Hansa was 110.5 meters (362 ft 6 in) long overall and had a beam of 17.6 m (57 ft 9 in) and a draft of 7.08 m (23 ft 3 in) forward. As designed, she displaced 5,885 t (5,792 long tons), and at full load, her displacement rose to 6,705 t (6,599 long tons). The ship's superstructure included a large conning tower forward and a smaller deck house further aft. She was fitted with a heavy military mast atop the conning tower and a lighter pole mast further aft. Her hull featured a flared clipper bow combined with a pronounced ram. The ship had a crew of 31 officers and 446 enlisted men.

Her propulsion system consisted of three vertical 4-cylinder triple-expansion steam engines, each driving a single screw propeller. Steam was provided by eighteen coal-fired Belleville boilers, which were vented through three funnels. Her engines were rated for 10,000 metric horsepower (9,900 ihp), and provided a top speed of 19 knots (35 km/h; 22 mph). Coal storage amounted to 950 t (930 long tons; 1,050 short tons) if all available spaces were used. The ship had a range of approximately 3,412 nautical miles (6,319 km; 3,926 mi) at the more economical speed of 12 kn (22 km/h; 14 mph).

The ship was armed with a main battery of two 21 cm (8.3 in) SK L/40 guns in single gun turrets, one forward and one aft. The guns were supplied with 58 rounds of ammunition each. They had a range of 16,300 m (53,500 ft). Hansa also carried a secondary battery of eight 15 cm (5.9 in) SK L/40 guns. Four were mounted in turrets amidships and the other four were placed in casemates, two abreast the conning tower and the others abreast the mainmast. These guns had a range of 13,700 m (44,900 ft). She also carried ten 8.8 cm (3.5 in) SK L/30 guns for defense against torpedo boats. The gun armament was rounded out by ten 3.7 cm (1.5 in) Maxim machine cannon. She was also equipped with three 45 cm (17.7 in) torpedo tubes with eight torpedoes, two launchers were mounted on the broadside and the third was in the bow, all below the waterline.

The ship was protected with Krupp armor; her deck was 4 cm (1.6 in) on the horizontal with sloped sides that were 10 cm (3.9 in) thick. Her main and secondary battery turrets had 10 cm thick sides and the secondary casemates had the same level of protection. The conning tower had 15 cm thick sides.

=== Modifications ===
Between 1907 and 1909, Hansa underwent a major reconstruction at the Kaiserliche Werft (Imperial Shipyard) in Danzig. This included replacing her boilers with new Navy-type models, and the funnels were reduced to two. Her military mast was removed to reduce the top-heaviness of the ship, which improved her handling in turns. Two of the 15 cm guns and all of the Maxim guns were removed, and an eleventh 8.8 cm SK L/30 gun was installed, along with three 8.8 cm SK L/35 guns. She was disarmed entirely by 1916.

== Service history ==
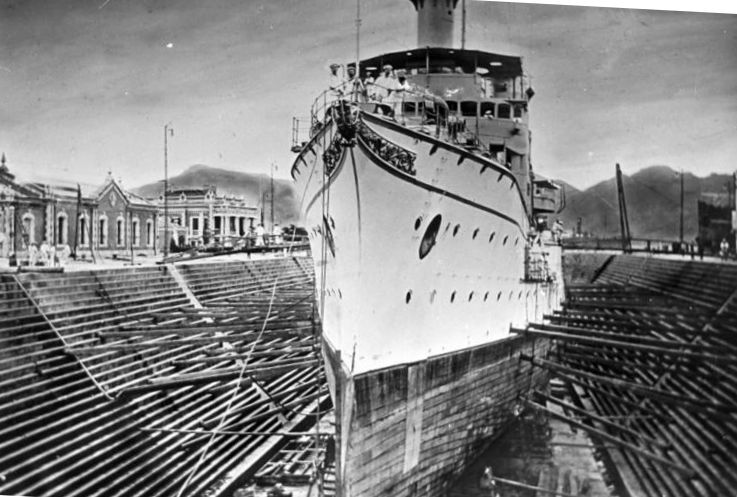
Hansa in drydock at AG Vulcan

Hansa was ordered under the contract name "N", (Note: German warships were ordered under provisional names. Additions to the fleet were given a single letter; ships intended to replace older or lost vessels were ordered as "Ersatz (name of the ship to be replaced)".) and was laid down at the AG Vulcan shipyard in Stettin on 23 July 1896, though some initial assembly of material had begun in workshops on 27 April. She was launched on 12 March 1898, having been christened by Johann Georg Mönckeberg, then the 2nd Mayor of Hamburg, one of the Hanseatic cities, which reflected a tradition of the Hanseatic League, after which Hansa had been named. Initial testing of her steam plant began on 14 October, and on 16 November, a shipyard crew took the ship to Swinemünde for a test cruise in the Baltic Sea three days later. Hansa was then taken to Kiel, where her armament was installed, along with other final fitting out. She was commissioned on 20 April 1899 and began sea trials; during this period, she was commanded by Kapitän zur See (KzS–Captain at Sea) Emil Freiherr von Lyncker. During her initial working up period on 6 June, she accidentally ran aground in the Great Belt due to heavy fog. She was pulled free by the coastal defense ships Odin and Ägir, but her hull was damaged in the incident. In July, Lyncker was relieved by Fregattenkapitän (FK—Frigate Captain) Hugo von Pohl. Hansa completed her acceptance trials on 11 August, though her propulsion machinery had not yet been fully evaluated, and she was not yet fully operational.

=== East Asia Squadron ===
==== 1899–1900 ====
Hansa was immediately assigned to the East Asia Squadron, owing to the need to replace the generally obsolete vessels Germany had previously sent to the unit, and she departed Germany on 16 August, bound for the Far East. Her engines and boilers proved troublesome on the voyage. She stopped in the Levant from 31 August to 4 September to deliver gifts from Kaiser Wilhelm II to holy sites in Jerusalem and Haifa. The ship then passed through the Suez Canal, the Red Sea, and into the Indian Ocean, before stopping in the Maldives to conduct a hydrographic survey of the islands. Hansa stopped in Colombo, British Ceylon, on 29 September for a rest period for the engine room personnel, who had become overworked dealing with repeated breakdowns on the way. At one point in the Indian Ocean, all three engines and the electric generators had failed, forcing the crew to deploy sea anchors for several hours while repairs were carried out. Hansa left Colombo on 7 October and arrived in Singapore on 13 October, remaining there for four days.

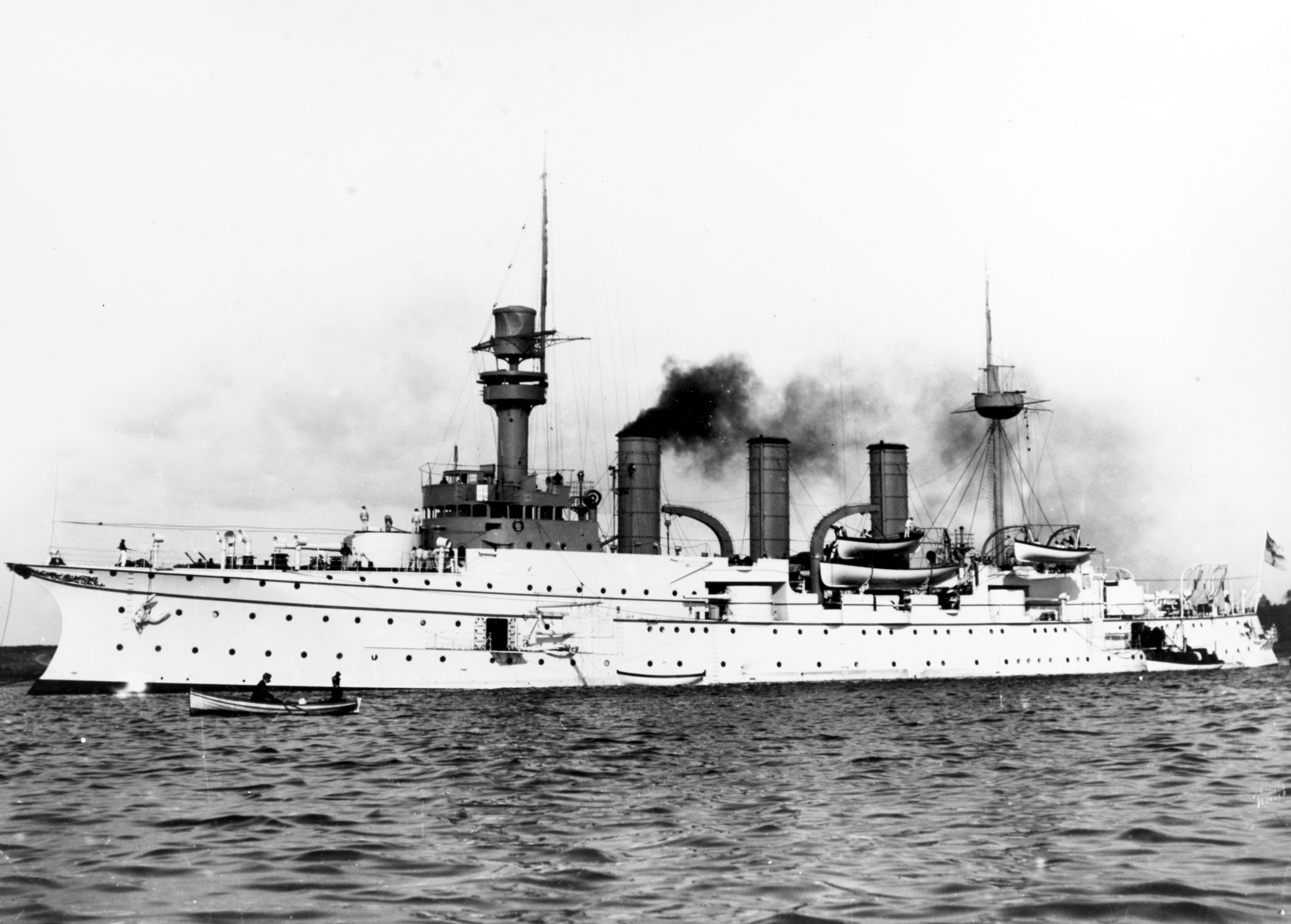
Hansa early in her career

After getting underway again on the 17th, the ship suffered a boiler explosion that killed two men, forcing Hansa to return to Singapore. She then left for Amoy, China, on 26 October, where her sister Hertha and the armored cruiser Deutschland arrived on 2 and 4 November, respectively. At that time, Deutschland served as the flagship of the squadron commander, Vizeadmiral (VAdm—Vice Admiral) Prince Heinrich of Prussia. Hansa replaced the elderly Deutschland as the deputy commander's flagship, and Konteradmiral (KAdm—Rear Admiral) Ernst Fritze came aboard the ship on the 4th. Hansa sailed to Shanghai on 11 November, before returning south to Hong Kong on 2 December for a major engine overhaul that was completed on 28 December. Prince Heinrich departed with Deutschland for Germany on 4 January 1900, leaving Fritze in command of the unit aboard Hansa until VAdm Felix von Bendemann arrived 17 February, who made Hertha his flagship. After a cruise south to Singapore, Hansa arrived in Qingdao in Germany's Jiaozhou Bay Leased Territory in China on 15 March. Fritze left for Germany as well on 8 April, and his replacement, KAdm Hermann Kirchhoff arrived aboard Hansa in mid-July.

Hansa then embarked on a cruise through the region but this was interrupted by the outbreak of the Boxer Uprising in China. The ship arrived off the Taku Forts on 7 June, where she joined an international fleet led by the British Vice Admiral Edward Seymour. The fleet attacked the fortifications on 16–17 June, resulting in the Battle of the Taku Forts, where Hansa, Hertha, the unprotected cruiser Gefion, and the protected cruiser Irene landed detachments of Seebataillone (marines) to seize the forts. Pohl, Hansa's captain, went ashore and led the attack on the fortresses. Seymour then organized an expedition to relieve the besieged embassies in Beijing. Hansa contributed a landing party of 123 men led by the ship's executive officer, (Captain Lieutenant) Paul Schlieper, to the Seymour Expedition. A total of around 450 German troops were contributed to the multi-national force, which totaled around 2,200 officers and men. Pohl was then placed in command of a group of cruisers from the international fleet. Hansa led the unit to conduct a series of attacks on coastal fortifications at Beidaihe, Qinhuangdao, and Shanhaiguan. The ship thereafter saw no further action during the conflict. In the course of operations, Hansa's crew had suffered thirteen dead and twenty-four wounded, the heaviest casualties of any German warship involved in the conflict.

==== 1901–1906 ====
Hansa thereafter withdrew from Chinese waters to visit Nagasaki, Japan, in mid-October. From there, she departed for Hong Kong on 30 December, where she entered dry dock for periodic maintenance. While she was there, KAdm Hunold von Ahlefeld replaced Kirchhoff as the squadron deputy commander and FK Adolf Paschen relieved Pohl. She then returned to Tsingtao on 5 March 1901. Toward the end of the month, Hansa received orders to steam to Australia to represent Germany for the ceremonies commemorating the Federation of Australia. The ship got underway on 31 March and sailed via Singapore and Batavia, Dutch East Indies, and Fremantle, Australia, before arriving in Melbourne on 1 May. There, she met the unprotected cruiser Cormoran. The two vessels then joined an international squadron for the ceremonies, which was observed by Prince Albert, Duke of York. The fleet then steamed to Sydney on 18 May, where the ceremonies took place. Hansa then cruised briefly with the gunboat Möwe, then in use as a survey ship, before departing on 24 May to return to Tsingtao, by way of Matupi Harbor, New Britain, and Manila in the Philippines. She arrived in Tsingtao on 19 June. For the rest of the year, Hansa cruised around the station area, visiting numerous ports in East Asia.

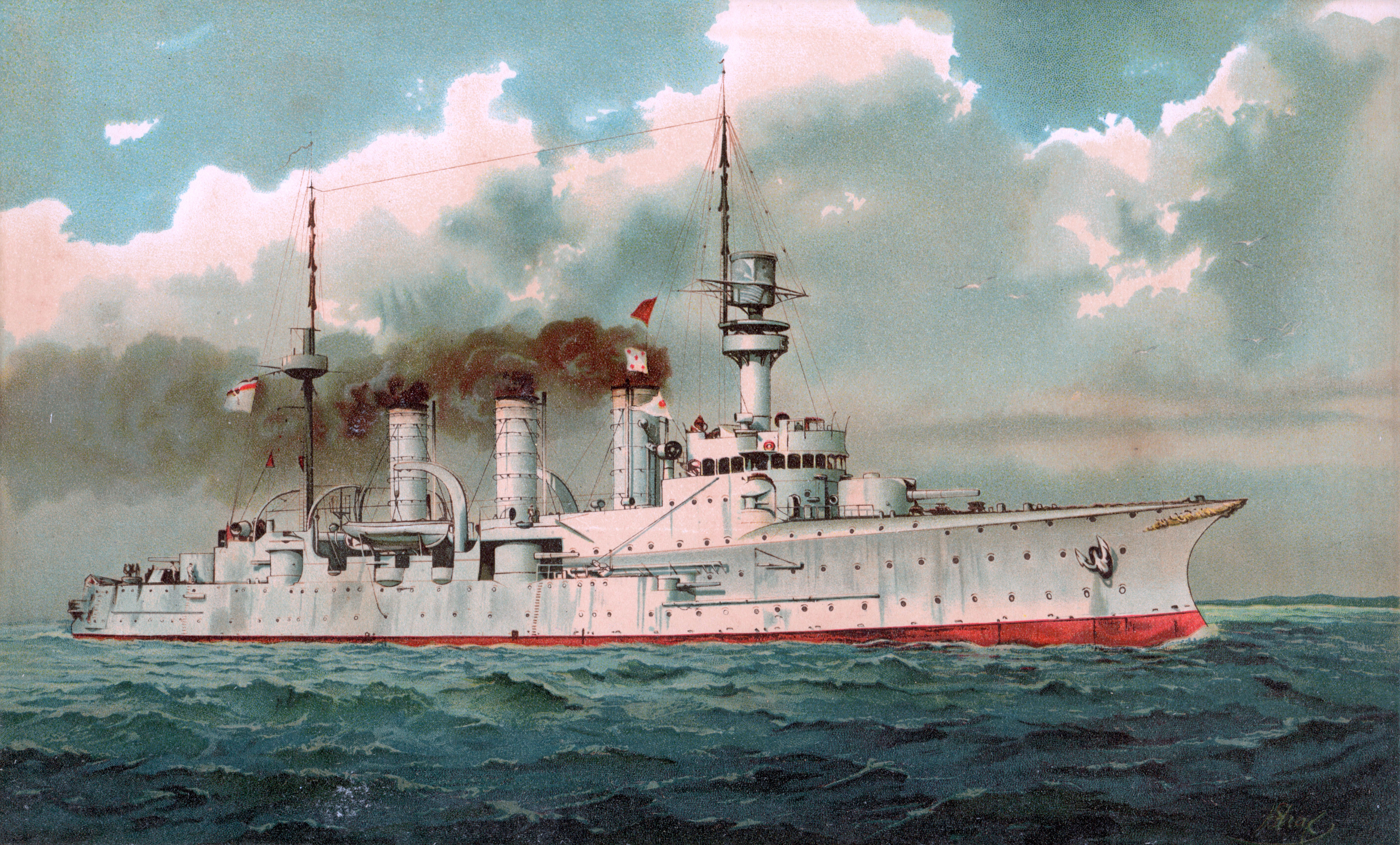
Lithograph of Hansa in 1902

On 26 August 1902, Ahlefeld left the ship and his replacement, KAdm Friedrich von Baudissin later arrived on 19 November. That month, Hansa entered the Yangtze and steamed as far upriver as Nanking, where she took part in the funeral ceremony for the viceroy of Guangxi Province. Hansa made another voyage up the Yangtze to Nanking in March 1903, where Baudissin transferred to the gunboat Luchs, which carried him further to Hankou. Hansa next visited Japan in April, where Emperor Meiji came aboard the vessel. While there, she represented Germany at a Japanese fleet review held at Kobe. FK Johannes Schröder took command of the ship in June. On 11 July, the ship steamed into the British naval base at Weihaiwei, along with the Chinese cruiser Hai Chi. Hansa left the port two days later. On 20 October, Baudissin left the ship, and his replacement, KzS Henning von Holtzendorff, arrived 22 November. The ship made another voyage through the region before stopping in Uraga, Japan, on 27 December. At that time, FK Ernst van Semmern replaced Paschen. She underwent an overhaul there that lasted into early January 1904. On 16 January, Hansa visited Mirs Bay outside of Hong Kong and departed after two days in the harbor. After the outbreak of the Russo-Japanese War the following month, Hansa went to evacuate German nationals from Seoul, Korea, and Port Arthur and Dalian on the Liaodong Peninsula and took them to Qingdao. FK Eugen Weber took command of the ship in June.

In early March, she was again in Hong Kong, and was joined there by the flagship of the East Asia Squadron, the armored cruiser Fürst Bismarck on the 8th. In August, the badly damaged Russian battleship Tsesarevich and three destroyers sought refuge in the German naval base at Tsingtao following the Russian defeat in the Battle of the Yellow Sea. As Germany was neutral, the East Asia Squadron interned Tsesarevich and the destroyers. On 13 August, the Russian ships restocked their coal supplies from three British steamers, but Hansa and Fürst Bismarck cleared for action to prevent them from leaving the port. The two cruisers were joined by Hertha, Geier, and the gunboats Luchs and Tiger. KAdm Heinrich von Moltke arrived to replace Holtzendorff as the deputy commander on 16 December, though Hansa was no longer a flagship, as the position of 2nd Admiral had already been abolished on 27 July. The ship saw little activity of note in 1905. In April 1906, KzS Friedrich Marwede relieved Weber. On 20 May 1906, she assisted the Norddeutscher Lloyd steamer SS Roon, which had run aground off Kōzu-shima in the Philippine Sea. After pulling her free, Hansa towed the vessel to Nagasaki. On 4 July, she received orders to return to Germany; she arrived in Danzig by 26 October, where she was decommissioned at the Kaiserliche Werft there.

=== Later career ===
Hansa went into dry dock at the Kaiserliche Werft in April 1907 for a refit, during which she was re-boilered. Hansa originally had three stacks, and during the modernization they were trunked into two funnels. The refit was finished by 1 April 1909, at which point Hansa was recommissioned for service as a training ship for naval cadets and apprentice seamen. KzS Otto Back took command of the vessel at that time. For the next few months, Hansa cruised in German waters and the western Baltic Sea with a contingent of trainees, before making a visit to Norway. On 23 August, she embarked on a major training cruise to the Mediterranean Sea that lasted until 15 March 1910, when she arrived back in Kiel. There, she went into dry dock for periodic maintenance; in April, FK Constanz Feldt replaced Back. Training activities for the rest of 1910 followed those of the preceding year. On 23 August, she got underway for another major overseas voyage. This trip went to the Caribbean Sea and the East Coast of the United States, and concluded on 14 March 1911. From 1911 to 1912, Günther Lütjens served aboard Hansa as commander of the naval cadets that trained on the ship.

Hansa went on a short training cruise on 8 June before beginning another voyage to the United States on 26 August. During the voyage, in early January, Hansa visited Bermuda. She arrived back in Germany on 7 March 1912. In April, FK Friedrich von Kameke replaced Feldt as the ship's captain. After another repair period, she began another voyage on 4 June in the Baltic, visiting Karlskrona, Sweden, and St. Petersburg, Russia, from 3 to 15 July. The ship got underway for another major training cruise on 30 August, which again went to the United States and the Caribbean, and concluded on 11 May 1913. After making short training voyages in home waters in mid-1913, Hansa began what would be her final overseas cruise on 11 August, this time to the Mediterranean. She arrived back in Germany on 17 March 1914. FK Karl von Hornhardt, the ship's last captain, took command in April.

=== World War I ===
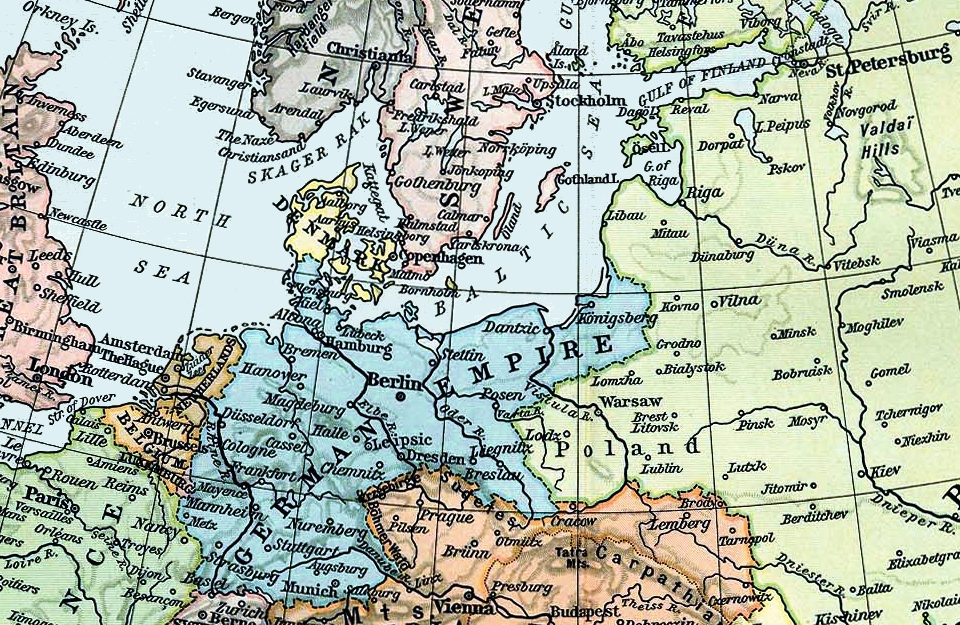
Map of the North and Baltic Seas in 1911

The outbreak of World War I in July 1914 interrupted the planned overseas cruise that summer. She left Wilhelmshaven on 11 August and arrived in Kiel the following day. There, she became the flagship of KAdm Gisberth Jasper, who had been given command of the newly formed V Scouting Group, which included her three sister ships Victoria Louise, Vineta, and Hertha. The unit was briefly used to patrol the central Baltic from 27 to 31 August. The unit was initially assigned to the High Seas Fleet, Germany's main battle fleet, but on 21 September, it was transferred to the new Baltic Sea Naval Forces command under Prinz Heinrich. Hansa and the rest of the group were assigned to patrol duty in the western Baltic through 20 October. The next day, the unit was assigned to a sweep into the eastern Baltic toward Gotland, though Hansa did not participate in the operation. She instead went to Danzig for an overhaul on the 22nd and Jasper transferred to Hertha for the operation, which began on 24 October. The work lasted just a few days, and Jasper returned to his flagship on 28 October after she had been moved to Swinemünde.

Hansa was then taken back to Kiel, where preparations to decommission the ships of V Scouting Group had begun. The naval command had determined that their weak armor protection, particularly their vulnerability to underwater attacks, precluded front-line use. Also, the navy struggled with crew shortages, and decommissioning the ships would free men for other, more useful vessels. On 16 November, Hansa and the other four cruisers were decommissioned and thereafter employed in secondary roles. Hansa became a barracks ship for torpedo boat crews, based in the Kaiserliche Werft in Kiel. Following Germany's defeat in November 1918, Hansa was stricken from the naval register on 6 December 1919 and sold to ship breakers in Audorf-Rendsburg. She was scrapped the following year.
