= SMS Victoria Louise =

Protected cruiser of the German Imperial Navy

- Victoria Louise during the Hudson–Fulton Celebration, 1909

History

German Empire
- Name: Victoria Louise
- Namesake: Princess Viktoria Luise of Prussia
- Builder: AG Weser, Bremen
- Laid down: 8 or 9 April 1896
- Launched: 29 March 1897
- Commissioned: 20 February 1899
- Decommissioned: 7 November 1914
- Stricken: 1 October 1919
- Fate: Broken up, 1923

General characteristics
- Class & type: Victoria Louise-class cruiser
- Displacement: Normal: 5,660 t (5,570 long tons); Full load: 6,491 t (6,388 long tons)
- Length: 110.60 m (362 ft 10 in)
- Beam: 17.40 m (57 ft 1 in)
- Draft: 6.58 m (21 ft 7 in)
- Installed power: 12 × Dürr boilers; 10,000 PS (9,900 ihp)
- Propulsion: 3 × triple-expansion steam engines; 3 × screw propellers
- Speed: 19.2 knots (35.6 km/h; 22.1 mph)
- Range: 3,412 nmi (6,319 km; 3,926 mi) at 12 knots (22 km/h; 14 mph)
- Complement: 31 officers; 446 enlisted men
- Armament: 2 × 21 cm (8.3 in) guns; 8 × 15 cm (5.9 in) guns; 10 × 8.8 cm (3.5 in) guns; 10 × 3.7 cm (1.5 in) Maxim machine cannon; 3 × 45 cm (17.7 in) torpedo tubes
- Armor: Deck: 4 to 10 cm (1.6 to 3.9 in); Turrets: 10 cm; Casemates: 10 cm; Conning tower: 15 cm (5.9 in)

SMS Victoria Louise was the lead ship of her class of protected cruisers, built for the German Imperial Navy (Kaiserliche Marine) in the late 1890s. She was laid down at the AG Weser shipyard in 1895, launched in March 1897, and commissioned into the German fleet in February 1899. She was named after Princess Victoria Louise, the daughter of Kaiser Wilhelm II. The ship was armed with a battery of two 21 cm guns and eight 15 cm guns and had a top speed of 19.2 knots (35.6 km/h; 22.1 mph). Though the five Victoria Louise-class cruisers proved to be disappointing in some ways, they marked the beginning of a decade of German cruiser construction.

Victoria Louise served with the fleet in home waters for the first seven years of her career. During this time, she was assigned to I Battle Squadron, part of the Heimatflotte (Home Fleet), and she took part in routine peacetime training exercises. She represented Germany during the funeral of Queen Victoria in 1901. The ship was transferred to I Scouting Group, the fleet's reconnaissance unit, in 1903. Later that year, she participated in a cruise to Spain.

In 1906, she was modernized and after 1908, used as a training ship for naval cadets. In 1909, she visited the United States, and at the outbreak of World War I, was mobilized into V Scouting Group. She was attacked unsuccessfully by the British submarine HMS E1 in October 1914, and at the end of the year she was withdrawn from service. She was used as a mine storage hulk and barracks ship based in Danzig for the rest of the war. Victoria Louise was sold in 1919 and converted into a freighter the following year, though she served in this capacity until late 1922, when she was broken up for scrap.

== Design ==
In the early 1890s, elements in the German naval command structure grappled with what type of cruiser ought to be built to fulfill the various needs of the fleet. The Reichsmarineamt (RMA—Imperial Navy Office) preferred to build a combination of large cruisers of around 6,000 t (5,900 long tons) along the lines of SMS Kaiserin Augusta and significantly smaller vessels of about 1,500 t (1,476 long tons) to support them, while the Oberkommando der Marine (Naval High Command) argued that a uniform force of 3,000 t (2,953 long tons) cruisers was preferable. In the event, the RMA carried the day and three 6,000-ton cruisers were authorized in 1895; this was in part due to the intervention of Kaiser Wilhelm II and in part due to comparisons with foreign contemporaries, like the United States' Baltimore and the Austro-Hungarian Kaiserin und Königin Maria Theresia. The experience of Japanese cruisers during the contemporaneous First Sino-Japanese War showed the benefit of larger 21 cm (8.3 in) guns, which were adopted for the main battery of the Victoria Louise class.

They resembled the larger Kaiser Friedrich III-class battleships, designed at the same time, albeit at reduced scale. The new cruisers proved to be unsatisfactory as fleet cruisers, because they were too slow and they lacked sufficient armor protection. They nevertheless provided good service as overseas cruisers and later as training ships. They (along with the contemporaneous armored cruiser Fürst Bismarck) nevertheless marked the beginning of a trend of German cruiser construction that lasted through the Scharnhorst-class cruisers built a decade later.

=== Characteristics ===
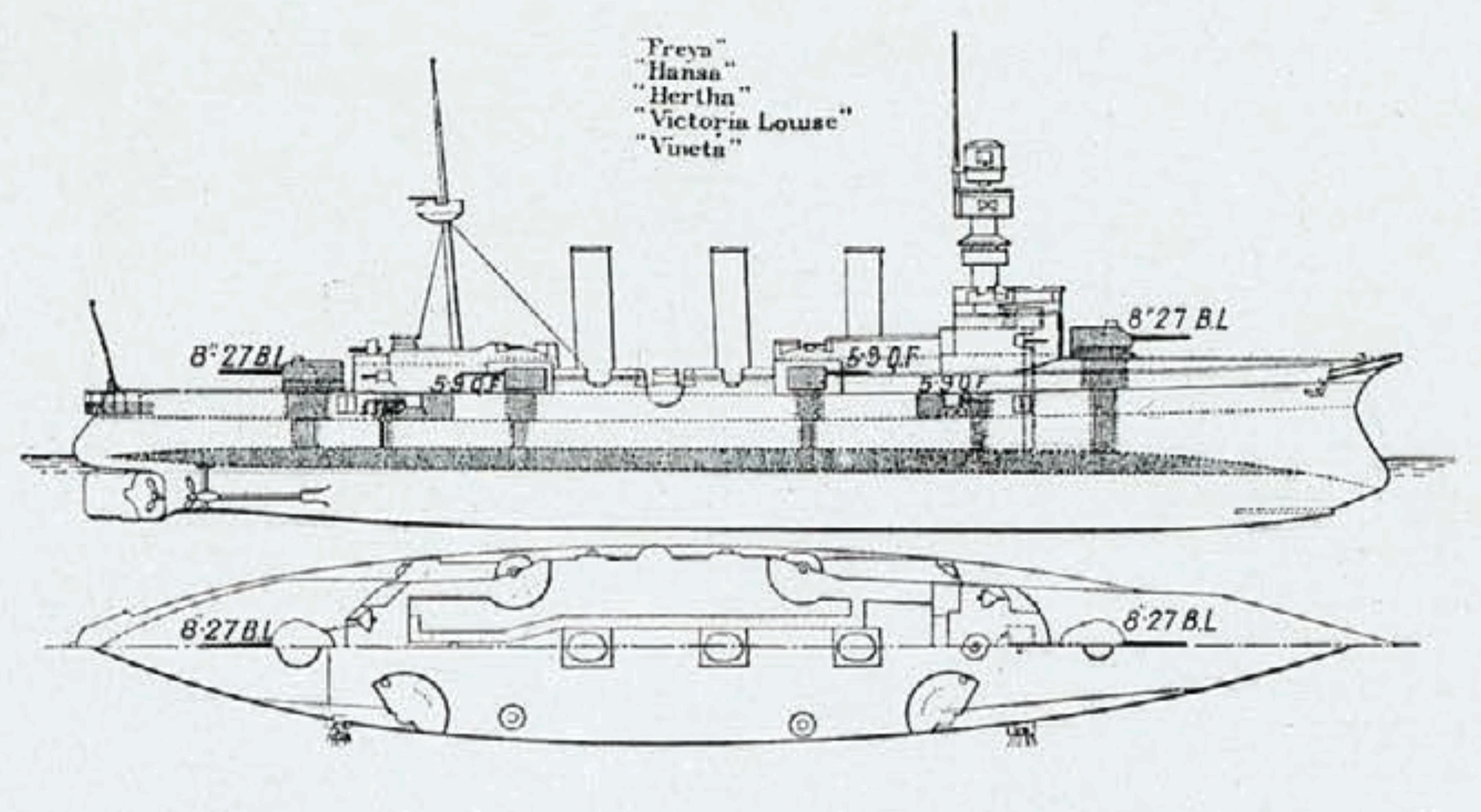
Plan and profile drawing of the Victoria Louise class

Victoria Louise was 110.6 meters (362 ft 10 in) long overall and had a beam of 17.40 m (57 ft 1 in) and a draft of 6.58 m (21 ft 7 in) forward. As designed, she displaced 5,660 t (5,570 long tons), and at full load, her displacement rose to 6,491 t (6,388 long tons). The ship's superstructure included a large conning tower forward and a smaller deck house further aft. She was fitted with a heavy military mast atop the conning tower and a lighter pole mast further aft. Her hull featured a flared clipper bow combined with a pronounced ram. The ship had a crew of 31 officers and 446 enlisted men.

Her propulsion system consisted of three vertical 4-cylinder triple-expansion steam engines, each driving a single screw propeller. Steam was provided by twelve coal-fired Dürr boilers, which were vented through three funnels. Her engines were rated for 10,000 metric horsepower (9,900 ihp), and provided a top speed of 19.2 knots (35.6 km/h; 22.1 mph). Coal storage amounted to 950 t (930 long tons; 1,050 short tons) if all available spaces were used. The ship had a range of approximately 3,412 nautical miles (6,319 km; 3,926 mi) at the more economical speed of 12 knots (22 km/h; 14 mph).

The ship was armed with a main battery of two 21 cm (8.3 in) SK L/40 guns in single gun turrets, one forward and one aft. The guns were supplied with 58 rounds of ammunition each, and they had a range of 16,300 m (53,500 ft). Victoria Louise also carried a secondary battery of eight 15 cm (5.9 in) SK L/40 guns. Four were mounted in single turrets amidships and the other four were placed in casemates in the main deck, two abreast the conning tower and the others abreast the mainmast. These guns had a range of 13,700 m (44,900 ft). For defense against torpedo boats, she carried ten 8.8 cm (3.5 in) SK L/30 guns. The gun armament was rounded out by ten 3.7 cm (1.5 in) Maxim machine cannon. She was also equipped with three 45 cm (17.7 in) torpedo tubes with eight torpedoes, two launchers were mounted on the broadside and the third was in the bow, all below the waterline.

The ship was protected with Krupp armor; her deck was 4 cm (1.6 in) on the horizontal with sloped sides that were 10 cm (3.9 in) thick. Her main and secondary battery turrets had 10 cm thick sides and the secondary casemates had the same level of protection. The conning tower had 15 cm thick sides.

=== Modifications ===
Between 1906 and 1908, Victoria Louise underwent a major reconstruction at the Kaiserliche Werft (Imperial Shipyard) in Kiel. This included replacing her boilers with new Navy-type models, and the funnels were reduced to two. Her military mast was removed to reduce the top-heaviness of the ship, which improved her handling in turns. Two of the 15 cm guns and all of the Maxim guns were removed, and an eleventh 8.8 cm SK L/30 gun was installed, along with three 8.8 cm SK L/35 guns. In 1912, Victoria Louise received a large flying bridge, the only member of the class to receive the feature. She was disarmed entirely by 1916.

== Service history ==
Victoria Louise at some point before 1904

=== Construction – 1903 ===
Victoria Louise was ordered under the contract name "L", (Note: German warships were ordered under provisional names. Additions to the fleet were given a single letter; ships intended to replace older or lost vessels were ordered as "Ersatz (name of the ship to be replaced)".) and was laid down at the AG Weser shipyard in Bremen on 8 or 9 April 1896, (Note: The historian Dirk Nottelmann provides the keel laying date as 8 April, while Hans Hildebrand, Albert Röhr, and Hans-Otto Steinmetz state 9 April.) though preparatory work had begun in workshops at the yard on 15 October 1895. She was launched sideways on 29 March 1897 in the presence of Frederick Augustus II, Grand Duke of Oldenburg, who gave a speech during the ceremony. Work proceeded slowly, primarily the result of slow deliveries of critical components like the ship's guns. After completing fitting-out work, she was commissioned into the German navy on 20 February 1899. The ship's first commander was Kapitän zur See (KzS—Captain at Sea) Hugo Westphal, who oversaw the conduction of sea trials from her commissioning to 11 September. At that time, the ship was temporarily decommissioned and placed in reserve for improvements to be made at the Kaiserliche Werft (Imperial Shipyard) in Wilhelmshaven.

Victoria Louise was recommissioned for additional trials on 22 August 1900, now under the command of KzS Hans Meyer. These trials lasted until 21 December, after which further, minor improvements were made. On 28 January 1901, Victoria Louise joined the squadron, commanded by Prince Heinrich, that went to Britain to participate in the funeral of Queen Victoria in 1901. The visit lasted until 7 February. Victoria Louise was assigned to I Battle Squadron of the Heimatflotte (Home Fleet) on 20 April, where she remained through 28 February 1903. Throughout this period, the ship participated in the annual training routine of squadron and fleet maneuvers. KzS Raimund Winkler served as the ship's captain from April to September 1901. In October 1901 and March 1902, Victoria Louise briefly served with the Artillerie-Inspektion (Artillery Inspectorate), though she remained formally assigned to I Squadron during those periods. The ship remained in home waters when the rest of the squadron visited Britain in early 1902. In September that year, Fregattenkapitän (FK—Frigate Captain) Johannes Merten took command of the ship, remaining in that position through the following year.

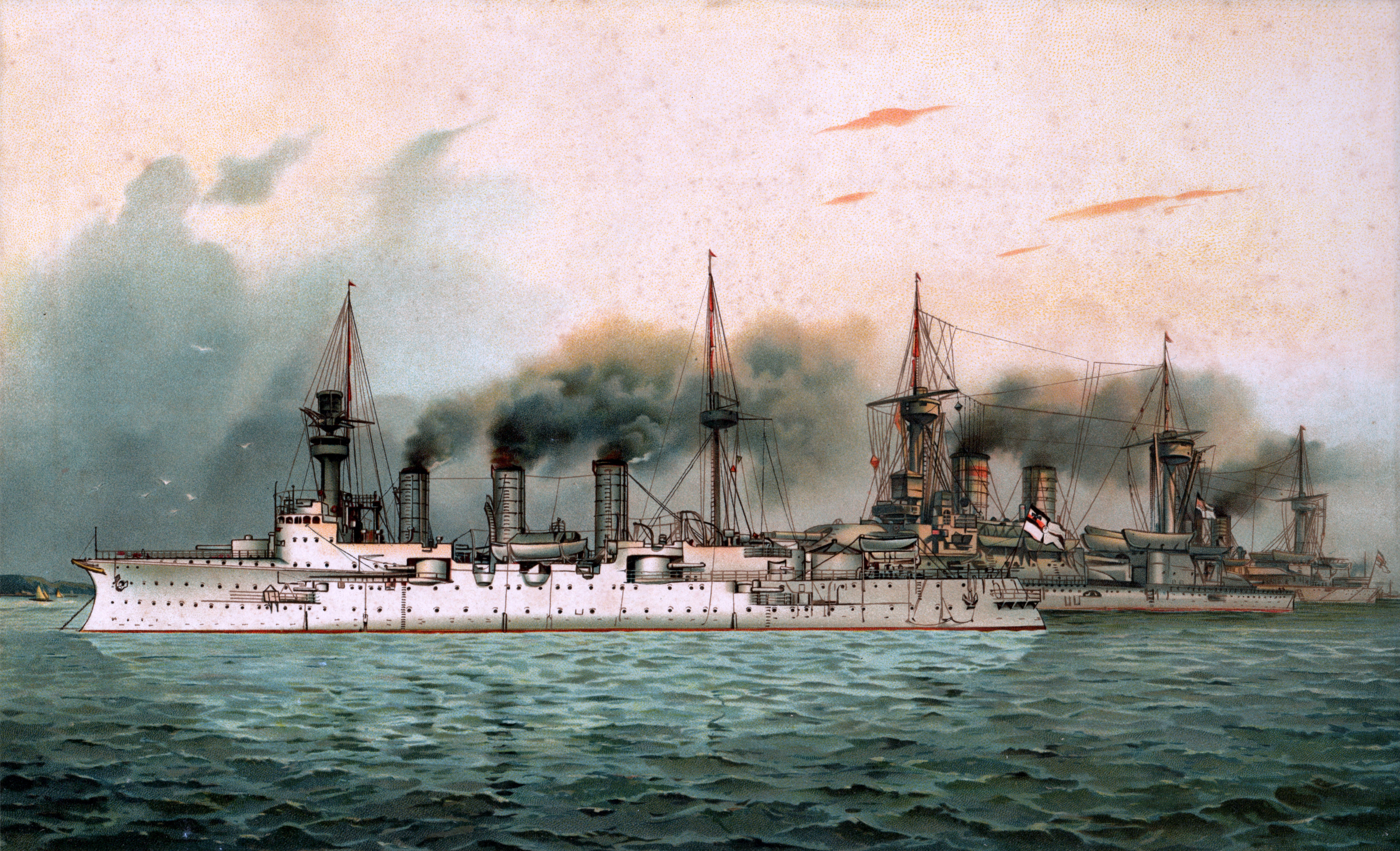
Victoria Louise and the battleships Kurfürst Friedrich Wilhelm and Weissenburg

During the annual fleet maneuvers conducted in autumn 1902, Victoria Louise operated with the light cruiser Amazone and the aviso Hela as part of I Scouting Group, the main reconnaissance unit of the German fleet. Konteradmiral (Rear Admiral) Ludwig Borckenhagen, at that time the deputy commander of I Squadron, used Victoria Louise as his flagship from 23 November to 14 December 1902. On 1 March 1903, Victoria Louise was reassigned to I Scouting Group, along with the armored cruiser Prinz Heinrich. She took part in a cruise into the Atlantic that went as far as Spain, where she visited Vigo. During fleet maneuvers held from 26 to 30 October, the ship served as a stand in for the coastal defense ship Hildebrand, which was at that time undergoing repairs. She operated as the flagship of Vizeadmiral (Vice Admiral) Ernst Fritze, the commander of II Battle Squadron for that exercise. Victoria Louise then returned to I Scouting Group for a subsequent round of maneuvers held from 30 November to 12 December in the Baltic and North Seas. Following the conclusion of the exercise, she returned to Wilhelmshaven, where she was decommissioned again.

=== 1906–1914 ===
In 1906, the ship went into dock for modernization in the Kaiserliche Werft in Kiel. After emerging from the drydock in 1908, Victoria Louise served as a training ship for naval cadets and apprentice seamen. She was recommissioned 2 April, to replace the old screw corvette Stein. She was assigned to the training command, but she remained on the list of warships, not the list of training vessels. FK Franz Mauve took command of the vessel after her return to service. Victoria Louise, now based in Kiel, went on a series of short cruises in the Baltic and North Seas in the weeks following her recommissioning.

Victoria Louise, probably during her visit to US in 1909

Victoria Louise embarked on a major overseas cruise in July 1908; in addition to her crew of trainees, she carried a scientific commission to carry out atmospheric research with high-altitude balloons. While in Madeira, Portugal and Tenerife in the Canary Islands, the commission aboard Victoria Louise carried out the balloon tests between 28 July and 2 August. One of the balloons reached an altitude of 21,800 m (71,500 ft). The scientists disembarked on 5 August and the ship thereafter began a cruise in the Mediterranean Sea. While there in January 1909, she went to Messina, Italy, where she joined her sister ship Hertha to provide assistance to the city after a major earthquake. Victoria Louise then resumed her cruise, which ended with her return to Kiel on 10 March.

The ship began another major cruise overseas in August 1909, passing through the Azores on her way to the United States. She arrived in Newport News on 12 September, where she met Hertha; the light cruisers Bremen and Dresden joined them there on 13 and 22 September, respectively. There, under Mauve's overall command, the squadron participated in the Hudson–Fulton Celebration, which lasted from 26 September to 9 October. Grossadmiral (Grand Admiral) Hans von Koester was Germany's official representative, and he hoisted his flag aboard Victoria Louise for the duration of the ceremonies. Following the conclusion of the event, Victoria Louise departed for a training cruise in the West Indies that ended with her return to Kiel on 10 March 1910. In April, KzS Horst von Hippel took command of the ship.

In mid-1910, Victoria Louise moved to Wilhelmshaven before beginning that year's training cruise on 11 August. That year, she went to the Mediterranean once again, and in September and October, she stopped in Corfu, where her crew was present for the installation of a statue at the Achilleion palace, which Kaiser Wilhelm II had purchased in 1907. The ship returned to Kiel on 7 March 1911, where she briefly went into the shipyard for repairs. She then proceeded to Flensburg to visit the recently opened Mürwik Naval School. There, she embarked another crew of naval cadets for a training cruise in the Baltic, followed by a voyage to Norwegian waters. During a stop in Balestrand, Norway, she was visited by Wilhelm II, who was on his annual Norwegian cruise. From there, Victoria Louise began her overseas training cruise, which included stops in Iceland, North America, and the West Indies. The ship arrived back in Kiel on 4 March 1912, and the following month, KzS Theodor Frey relieved Hippel. In June, she visited Stockholm, Sweden.

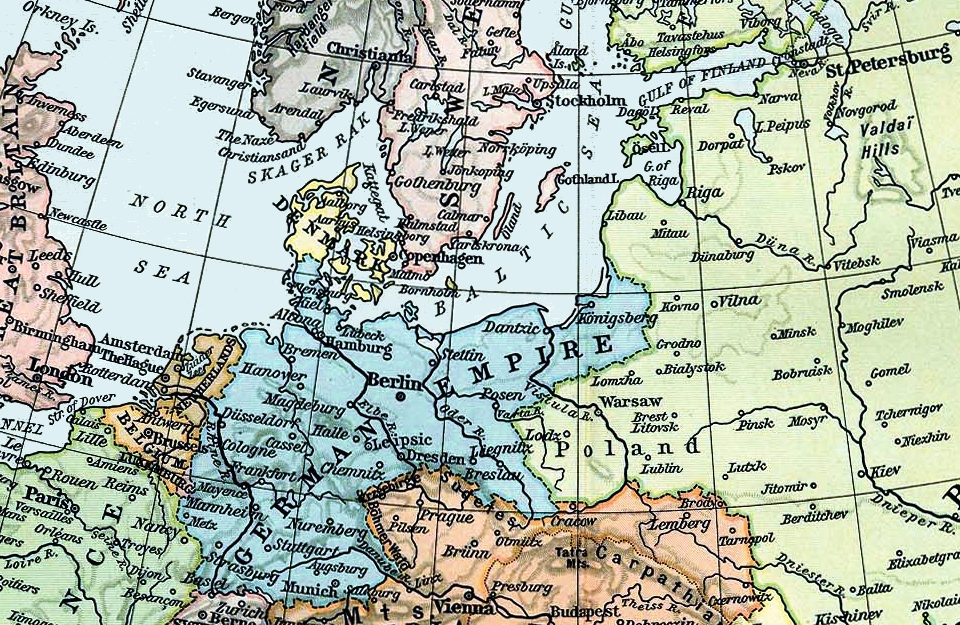
Map of the North and Baltic Seas in 1911

Victoria Louise departed for the 1912 training cruise on 10 August; she stopped shortly thereafter in Antwerp, Belgium, where King Albert I visited the ship. From there, she crossed the Atlantic to visit various ports in North America and the West Indies. From 31 October to 8 November, she lay at Veracruz, Mexico, where she protected German nationals in the area during the Mexican Revolution. The ship arrived back in Kiel on 10 March 1913. The last overseas training cruise began on 11 August at Wilhelmshaven and went to the Mediterranean. In December, Victoria Louise stopped in Piraeus, Greece; there King Constantine I and his wife Sophia, Wilhelm II's sister, celebrated Christmas aboard the cruiser. The ship returned to Kiel on 5 March 1914, where FK Hugo Dominik replaced Frey, before embarking on another Baltic cruise that began on 1 June and ended on 27 July in the midst of the July Crisis.

=== World War I and fate ===
Following the start of World War I on 28 July 1914, Victoria Louise was mobilized into V Scouting Group, which was tasked with training cadets in the Baltic Sea. After the unit was ready for operations, the ships were assigned to patrol duty on the line between the Dornbusch and Møn, Denmark. Shortly after 09:00 on 18 October, the British submarine HMS E1, commanded by Noel Laurence, attempted to torpedo Victoria Louise at a range of 460 m (1,510 ft). E1 launched two torpedoes, but they ran too deep and missed; Victoria Louise turned to starboard at 16 knots (30 km/h; 18 mph), the maximum speed she could make by that point. Lookouts spotted a periscope, but it submerged before gunners aboard Victoria Louise could open fire. This was nevertheless the only time a member of the Victoria Louise class would encounter enemy forces during the war. On 23 October, Victoria Louise returned to Danzig to be dry-docked for periodic maintenance. Shortly thereafter, and partly because of this incident, the naval command decided that the very weak armor protection of the Victoria Louise-class ships precluded further activity, and the unit was disbanded on 28 October. Repair work on Victoria Louise stopped and she was disarmed between 1 and 7 November. On the 7th, she was decommissioned.

Victoria Louise was thereafter converted into a mine storage hulk, and was also used as a barracks ship in Danzig. Following Germany's defeat in the war, the Admiralty Chief issued an order on 4 July 1919 striking Victoria Louise from the naval register, effective on 1 October. She was sold to the Norddeutscher Tiefbau company and rebuilt in 1920 into a cargo ship. This included removing internal bulkheads to create cargo holds (and strengthening the remaining hull structure to make up for the loss of those bulkheads); converting to a single shaft propulsion system (and moving the remaining engine further aft); and installing four boilers taken from the pre-dreadnought battleship Brandenburg, which was being broken up at the time. Victoria Louise retained her armor deck, even though it reduced storage capacity and made transferring cargo to and from the ship more difficult, because it was prohibitively expensive to remove. Work was completed by 20 November 1920, when the ship, which had been renamed Flora Sommerfeld, began sea trials. She reached a speed of 13.1 knots (24.3 km/h; 15.1 mph), though her service speed was set at 12 knots (22 km/h; 14 mph). She was operated by Danziger Hoch- und Tiefbau GmbH. She served in this capacity only briefly, as the conversion was not particularly successful; she was broken up for scrap, beginning in late 1922, in Danzig.
