= Victoria Louise-class cruiser =

German protected cruiser class built 1895–1899

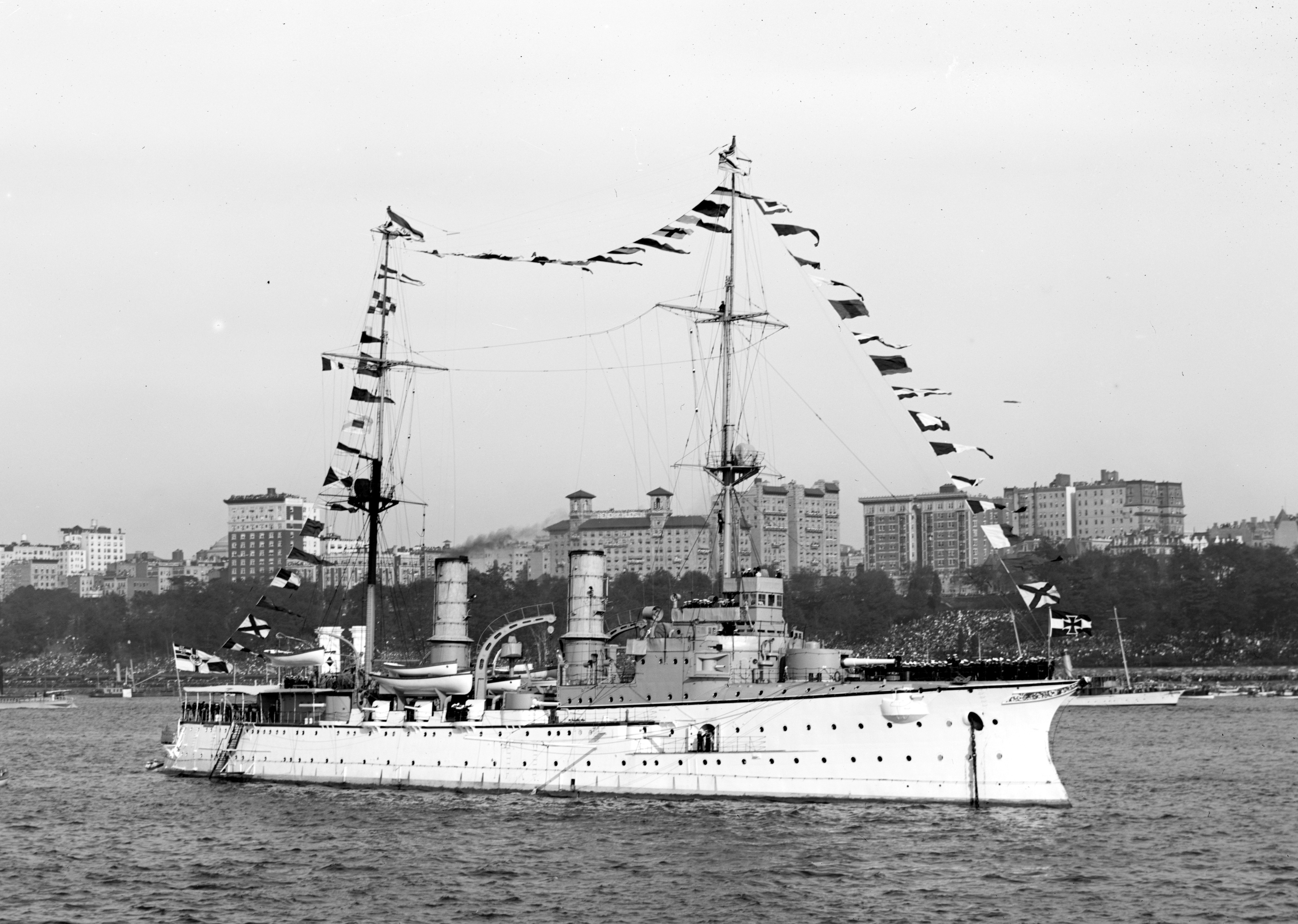
- SMS Victoria Louise in 1909

Class overview
- Name: Victoria Louise
- Operators: Imperial German Navy
- Preceded by: Kaiserin Augusta
- Succeeded by: Fürst Bismarck
- Built: 1895–1899
- In service: 1898–1921
- Completed: 5
- Retired: 5

General characteristics
- Type: Protected cruiser
- Displacement: Normal: 5,660 to 5,885 t (5,571 to 5,792 long tons); Full load: 6,491 to 6,705 t (6,388 to 6,599 long tons)
- Length: 110.50–110.6 m (362 ft 6 in – 362 ft 10 in)
- Beam: 17.40–17.6 m (57 ft 1 in – 57 ft 9 in)
- Draft: 6.58–7.08 m (21 ft 7 in – 23 ft 3 in)
- Installed power: 12 × fire-tube boilers; 10,000 metric horsepower (9,900 ihp)
- Propulsion: 3 × triple-expansion steam engines; 3 × screw propellers
- Speed: 18.5 to 19.5 knots (34 to 36 km/h; 21 to 22 mph)
- Range: 3,412 nmi (6,319 km; 3,926 mi) at 12 knots (22 km/h; 14 mph)
- Complement: 31 officers; 446 enlisted men
- Armament: 2 × 21 cm (8.3 in) guns; 8 × 15 cm (5.9 in) guns; 10 × 8.8 cm (3.5 in) guns; 10 × 37 mm (1.5 in) Maxim guns; 3 × 45 cm (17.7 in) torpedo tubes
- Armor: Deck: 4 to 10 cm (1.6 to 3.9 in); Turrets: 10 cm; Casemates: 10 cm; Conning tower: 15 cm (5.9 in)

The Victoria Louise class (Note: The class is sometimes referred to as the Hertha class, since Hertha was the first member to be ordered, though Victoria Louise was launched first.) of protected cruisers was the last class of ships of that type built for the German Imperial Navy. The class design introduced the combined clipper and ram bow and the blocky sides that typified later German armored cruisers. The class comprised five vessels, Victoria Louise, the lead ship, Hertha, Freya, Vineta, and Hansa. The ships were laid down in 1895–1896, and were launched in 1897–1898 and commissioned into the fleet over the following year.

The first three ships were 110.60 meters (362 ft 10 in) long and displaced 6,491 metric tons (6,388 long tons) at combat load; Vineta and Hansa were a slightly modified design. They were 110.50 m (362 ft 6 in) long and displaced 6,705 t (6,599 long tons) at full load. All five ships were armed with a main battery of two 21-centimeter (8.3 in) guns and eight 15 cm (5.9 in) guns. The first three ships had a top speed of 19.5 knots (36.1 km/h; 22.4 mph); the last two were slightly slower, at 18.5 knots (34.3 km/h; 21.3 mph). Problems with the Niclausse boilers installed on Freya prompted the Navy to standardize boiler types in future warships.

The ships of the class served in various units in the German fleet, including on the America Station, in the East Asia Squadron, and with the home fleet. Hertha and Hansa participated in the suppression of the Boxer Uprising in China in 1900, and Vineta was involved in the Venezuela Crisis of 1902–1903. All five ships were modernized between 1905 and 1911, after which they served as training ships for naval cadets. They were mobilized into V Scouting Group at the outbreak of World War I in August 1914, but were quickly withdrawn from front-line service. They served in various secondary roles for the rest of the war. After the end of the conflict, Victoria Louise was converted into a merchant ship, but was broken up in 1923. The other four ships were scrapped in 1920–1921.

== Background ==
In the mid-1880s, the German Kaiserliche Marine (Imperial Navy) had begun a program of construction to modernize its cruiser force, beginning with the Irene class of protected cruisers of 1886, followed the Schwalbe-class unprotected cruisers in 1886–1887 and Kaiserin Augusta in 1888. By the end of 1888, Admirals Alexander von Monts and Friedrich von Hollmann had become the chiefs of the Kaiserliche Admiralität (Imperial Admiralty) and Reichsmarineamt (RMA—Imperial Naval Office), respectively. At the time, naval construction in Germany was marred by a sense of strategic confusion; the navy was at the same time building the four Brandenburg-class battleships—necessary for an offensive strategy—and the coastal defense ships of the Siegfried and Odin classes—which belied an inherently defensive orientation for the fleet. At the same time, many elements of the naval command espoused the commerce raiding strategy of the French Jeune École (Young School).

Hollmann submitted a memorandum to the Reichstag (Imperial Diet) to request funding for a new construction program. He called for a total of seven new cruisers over the following three years to replace the old screw corvettes that still made up the bulk of the cruiser force, arguing that the old screw corvettes were no longer suitable as warships, owing to the proliferation of modern unprotected and protected cruisers in even minor navies around the world, along with the advances in marine steam engines, which propelled merchant vessels to speeds at which the corvettes could not catch them. The Reichstag's budget board decried what it viewed as the limitless demands of the navy. Instead of the three ships Hollmann had requested for the 1890/1891 fiscal year, the Reichstag authorized just two, which were given the provisional designations "J" and "K". The former became the unprotected cruiser Gefion, but a minor scandal in 1891 over "K"—the navy had not finalized the design for the new ship by the time it had asked for the second installment of funds for her construction—angered the Reichstag, which revoked funding for the new ship.

Attempts to secure the return of funds for "K" continued over the next three years, and included efforts in 1892 by Reichskanzler (Chancellor) Leo von Caprivi to convince the parliament to authorize construction. The navy tried yet again for the 1893 fiscal year, but the Imperial German Army had significantly increased its own budget that year, which left no additional funding for the fleet. In fiscal year 1894, the navy made no attempt to secure funding for "K". By this time, the strategic confusion that marked the 1880s had come to a head; Alfred von Tirpitz had recently become the chief of staff at the Kaiserliches Oberkommando der Marine (Imperial Naval High Command), and he was finalizing his famous memorandum, Dienstschrift IX, which laid out his plans for the future development of the navy. Tirpitz's projections were at odds with the leadership in the RMA; he sought a combination of 1st- and 3rd-class cruisers with the sole purpose of strengthening the fleet in home waters, while the RMA still favored a mix of 1st-, 2nd-, and 4th-class cruisers optimized for commerce raiding. To make matters worse, RMA was responsible for designing new warships, but they had no input on strategic objectives or war plans, which were the high command's remit.

== Design ==
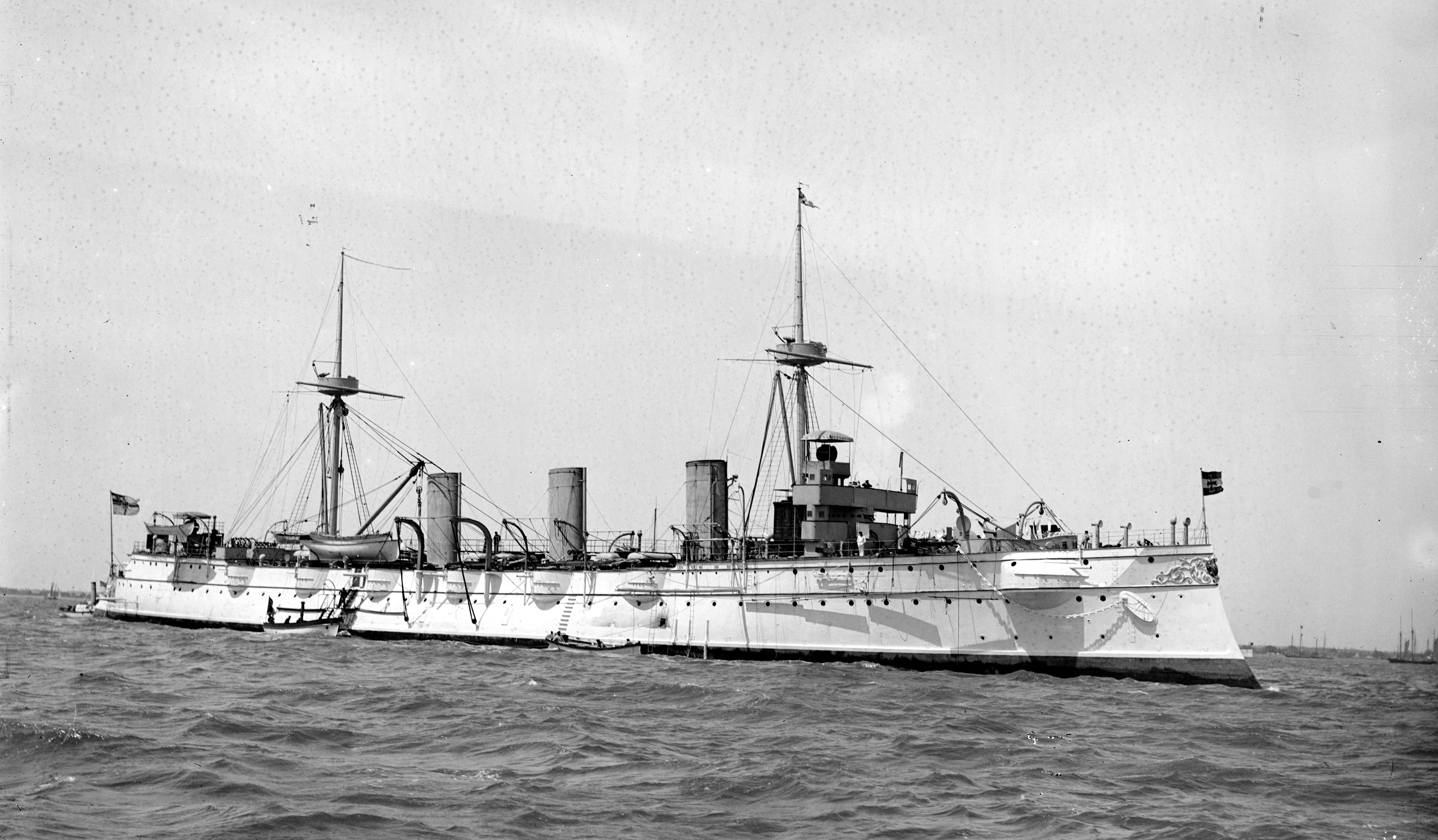
Kaiserin Augusta, the preceding protected cruiser

As the RMA began work on another proposal for "K" in early 1894, Kaiser Wilhelm II interjected himself into the discussions, submitting his own proposal for a 2nd-class cruiser that was clearly inspired by contemporary French cruisers in June. The RMA decided that the new cruiser would be, at a minimum, the same size as Gefion, with roughly the same price. Wilhelm continued to submit his ideas for consideration, including two different 3rd-class cruisers. One of these vessels, submitted in October, incorporated lessons from the First Sino-Japanese War, then being fought between Japan and China. The Battle of the Yellow River appeared to show the superiority of protected cruisers armed with large quick-firing guns over larger ironclad battleships armed with larger but slower-firing guns. As a result, Wilhelm included two 21 cm (8.3 in) quick-firing guns into his proposal in October.

Hollmann drew up a list of requirements for "K" in November, including fully enclosed and armored gun turrets for the 21 cm guns, a secondary battery of 15 cm (5.9 in) guns, but other critical components were left undecided. The question remained open as to whether to retain the traditional two-shaft propulsion system or repeat the three-shaft arrangement pioneered with Kaiserin Augusta. Wilhelm approved the parameters that month, and the Chief Constructor, Alfred Dietrich, prepared a more detailed proposal in line with them, which the Kaiser approved on 31 December. Discussions in February and March 1895 examined the open questions, but only some were settled, including a preference for water-tube boilers (though the specific manufacturer remained in question) and the anti-torpedo boat armament. The latter centered on two choices: a uniform battery of 5 cm (2.0 in) guns or a mixed battery of 8.8 cm (3.5 in) guns and 37 mm (1.5 in) Maxim guns; the greater power of the 8.8 cm gun was deemed to outweigh the advantage of a uniform battery, so that option was selected.

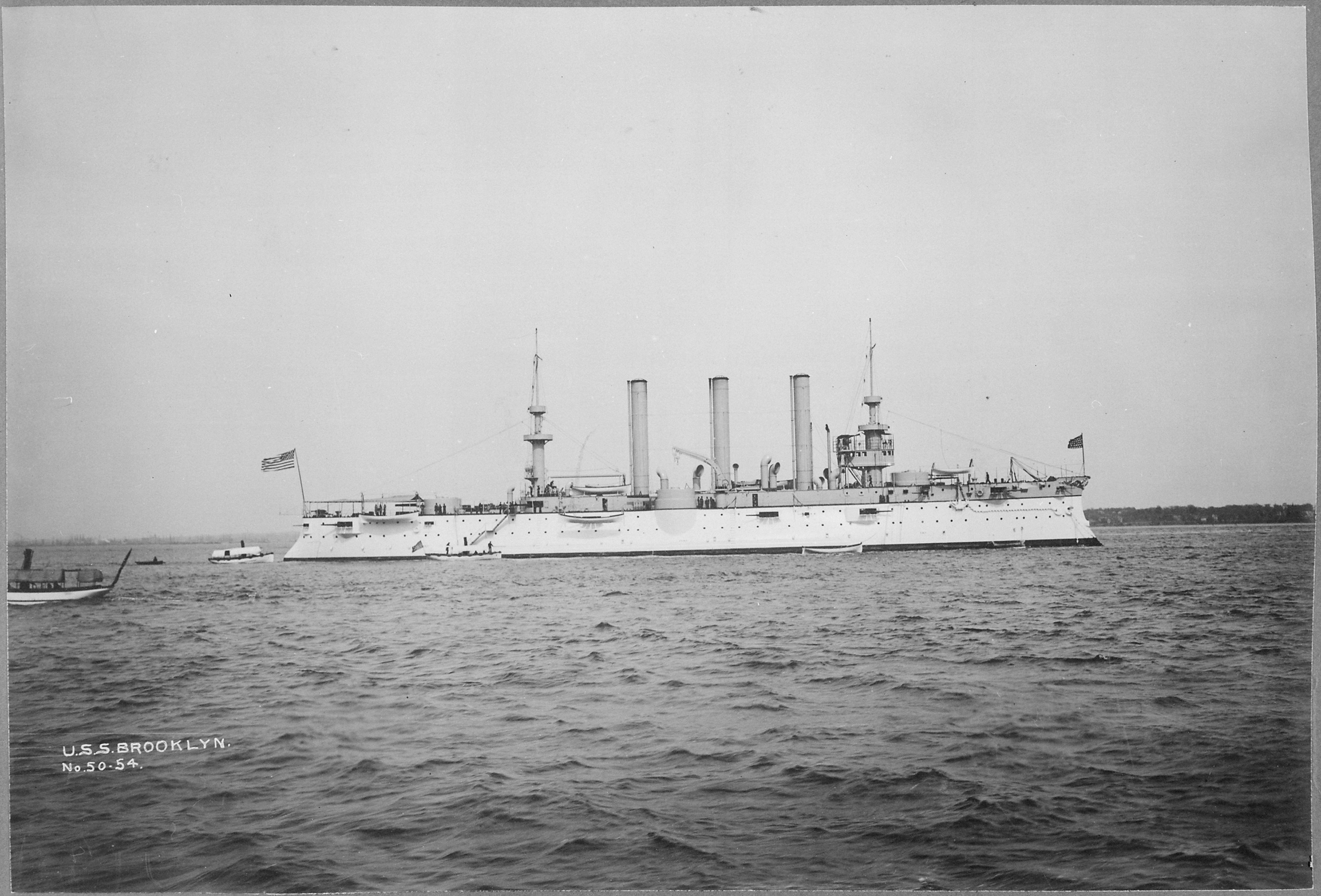
The US cruiser USS Brooklyn, which influenced the Victoria Louise design

After failing to secure budgetary approval for the new ships from the Reichstag in 1892, 1893, and 1894, the Reichstag finally authorized construction of three ships for the 1895–1896 budget year. The RMA's proposal was chosen and three 6,000-ton cruisers were begun in 1895. Two more vessels were authorized for 1896–1897. (Note: The acquisition of this last pair of ships saved Hollmann's tenuous position as state secretary of the RMA.) The Reichstag believed the orders for these ships indicated that the navy's preferences for larger, more expensive battleships had shifted toward cheaper cruisers, and thus voted unanimously for the measures. By this time, the design staff had settled on the triple-shaft arrangement for the ships' engines, and decided to order boilers from three different firms, with five differing configurations across the ships, to gather experience for future vessels.

Compared to Kaiserin Augusta, Victoria Louise had a displacement that was about six percent less, though she carried a much heavier armament. She also had a lower length to beam ratio, which reduced hydrodynamic efficiency, and thus maximum speed. The resulting design were smaller scale versions of the contemporary Kaiser Friedrich III-class battleships; they featured the same fore military mast and pole mainmast and a combination of gun turrets and casemates for the secondary battery. Dietrich modeled the ship's profile, particularly the bow shape, on the contemporary United States cruiser USS Brooklyn. The ships' design set a precedent for later armored cruisers, with large, bulky sides and a combined clipper bow and ram.

The new cruisers proved to be unsatisfactory as fleet cruisers, because they were too slow and they lacked sufficient armor protection. They nevertheless provided good service as overseas cruisers and later as training ships. Because of their shortcomings, particularly compared to later vessels, the Victoria Louise-class ships have been frequently criticized, including a characterization of them as "3-minute ships" (indicating the length of time they would survive in battle). The historian Dirk Nottelmann disagrees, pointing to contemporary vessels that had even lighter protection. He also notes the combat experiences of other fleets' protected cruisers in the First Sino-Japanese War, the Spanish–American War, and the Russo-Japanese War. Regardless, the Victoria Louise class (along with the contemporaneous armored cruiser Fürst Bismarck) marked the beginning of a trend of German cruiser construction that lasted through the Scharnhorst-class cruisers built a decade later.

=== General characteristics ===
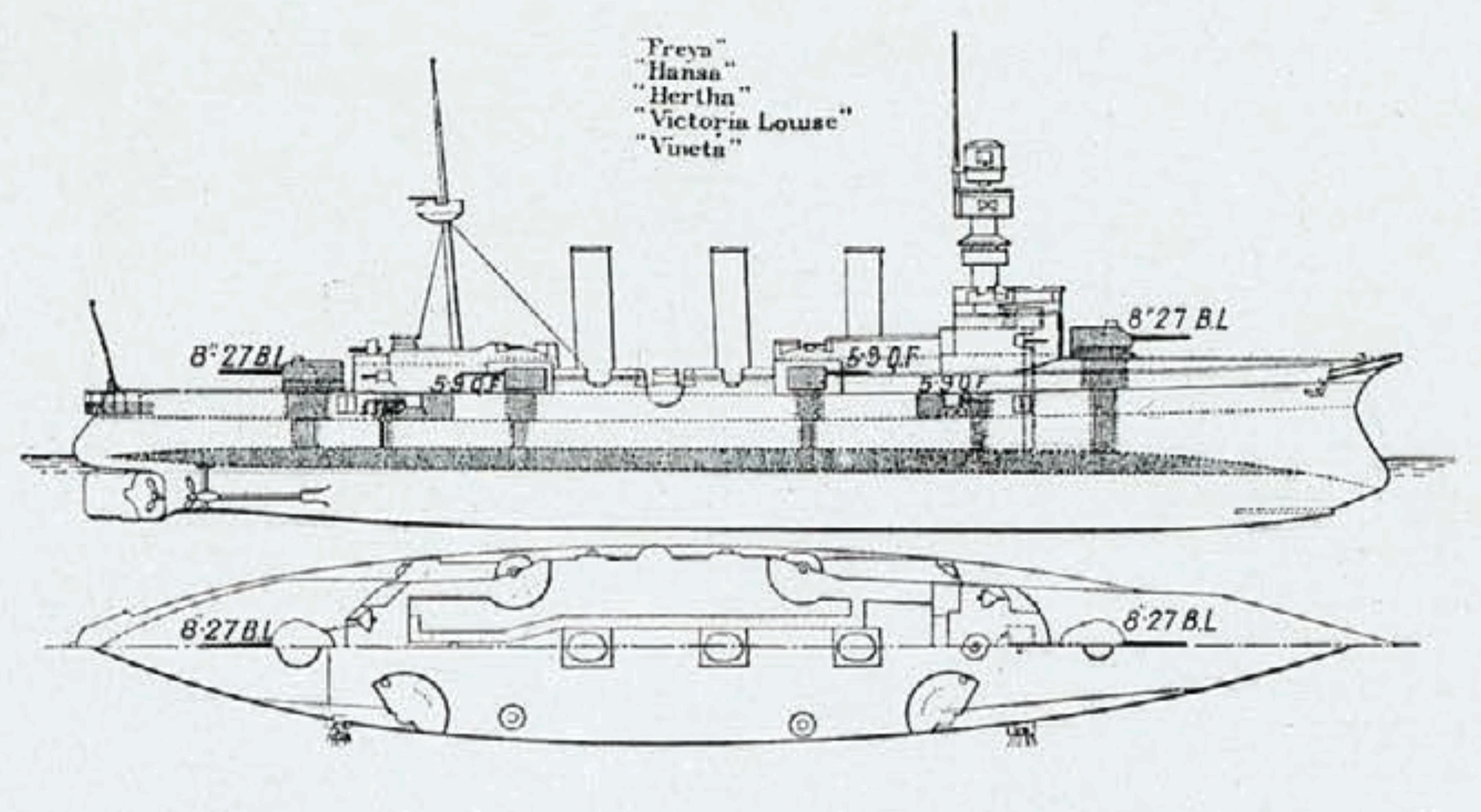
Line-drawing of the Victoria Louise class

The first three ships of the Victoria Louise class—Victoria Louise, Hertha, and Freya—were 109.10 meters (357 ft 11 in) long at the waterline and 110.60 m (362 ft 10 in) long overall. They had a beam of 17.40 m (57 ft 1 in) and a draft of 6.58 m (21 ft 7 in) forward and 6.93 m (22 ft 9 in). These ships displaced 5,660 metric tons (5,570 long tons) as designed and 6,491 t (6,388 long tons) at full load. Vineta and Hansa had slightly different dimensions; they were 109.80 m (360 ft 3 in) long at the waterline and 110.50 m (362 ft 6 in) overall. Their beam was 17.60 m (57 ft 9 in) and drew 7.08 m (23 ft 3 in) forward and 7.34 m (24 ft 1 in) aft. Their displacement was also higher than the first three ships, at 5,885 t (5,792 long tons) as designed and 6,705 t (6,599 long tons) at combat load.

The ships' hulls were constructed with longitudinal and transverse steel frames. For the latter pair of ships, Vineta and Hansa, a single layer of wood planks were used for the hull. A layer of Muntz metal sheathing extended up to 1 m (3 ft 3 in) above the waterline to protect against fouling of the hull. The first three ships, Victoria Louise, Hertha, and Freya, did not receive sheathing as a weight reduction measure. The hull was divided into twelve watertight compartments, which were later reduced to eleven, with the exception of Freya. The hull also incorporated a double bottom that extended for 60 percent of the length of the hull.

The ships' standard crew was 31 officers and 446 enlisted men, with an additional 9 officers and 41 enlisted while serving as a second command flagship. After their reconstruction into training ships, the crew was substantially enlarged to incorporate the trainees, with 26 officers and 658 sailors, 75 of whom were naval cadets and 300 others were cabin boys. The ships carried a number of smaller boats, including three picket boats, one launch, one pinnace, two cutters, two yawls, and three dinghies. After their modernization, the boats were significantly revised; the number of picket boats was reduced to one, a barge and a launch were added, the dinghies were removed, and five more cutters were added.

The ships were good sea boats; they had an easy motion and were dry as a result of their high forecastles. They had a tendency to pitch when steaming downwind, however, and made severe leeway in heavy winds because of their large superstructures. They were difficult to maneuver without the center shaft engaged. Steering was controlled with a single rudder. They lost only around ten percent speed in a head sea or with the rudder hard over. In addition, as the lower coal bunkers were emptied, the ships became increasingly unstable; with empty bunkers, the ships could heel over as much as fifteen degrees in a hard turn. The modernization of the ships between 1905 and 1911 rectified this problem. They had a transverse metacentric height of 0.56 to 0.73 m (1 ft 10 in to 2 ft 5 in). As built, the ships were very hot, and ventilation had to be improved before they were commissioned.

=== Machinery ===
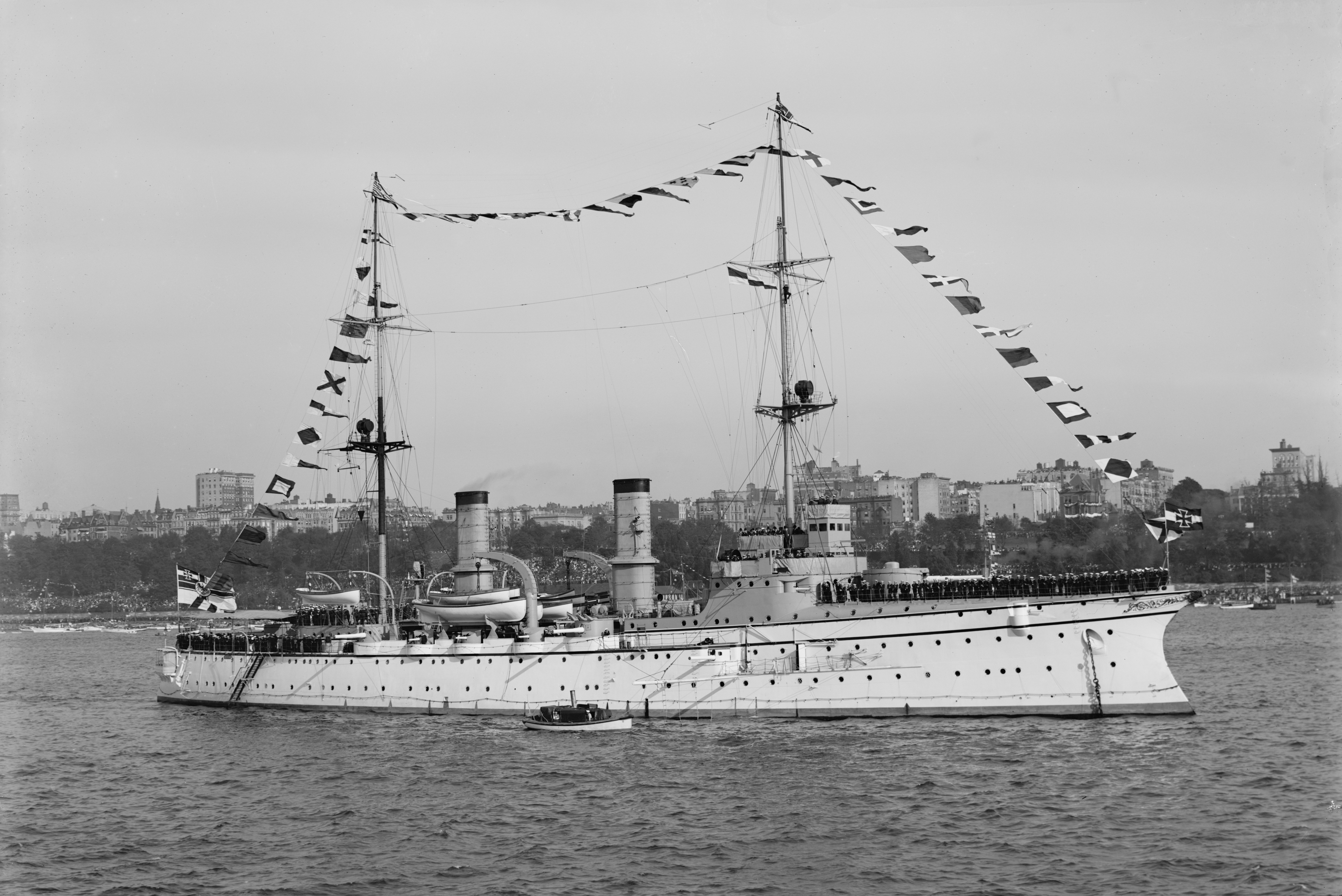
Hertha in 1909; her secondary guns and 8.8 cm anti-torpedo boat guns can all be seen trained directly out

The propulsion system of all five ships consisted of three vertical 4-cylinder triple-expansion steam engines built by AG Vulcan. The engines were compact enough to fit below the armor deck, which eliminated the need for a heavy armored glacis to protect them. Steam was provided by twelve coal-fired water-tube boilers from different manufacturers, with the exception of Hertha and Hansa, both which received eighteen boilers. Victoria Louise and Vineta had boilers from Dürr AG, Freya had Niclausse boilers, and Hertha and Hansa had Belleville boilers. To fully evaluate the boilers, each vessel was configured differently; each ship had a different total heating surface for the boilers. The boilers were ducted into three funnels.

All three boiler types suffered from at least some defects; the Dürr boilers proved to require frequent cleaning of the water tubes to prevent build-up of scaling, and they were difficult to clean. The fire boxes for the Belleville boilers were smaller and lacked economizers, which caused them to vent exhaust at much higher temperatures. This weakened the funnel casings and caused them to crumple. In addition, the water tubes were heated unevenly, which required very close supervision to prevent complete evaporation of the water and thus boiler explosions. The Niclausse boilers in Freya proved to be particularly troublesome, suffering from the same uneven heating problems of the Belleville boilers, along with a tendency to crack due to poor materials in critical components. The trouble with the ships' boilers, especially Freya's, led the Navy to use only Schulz-Thornycroft or Marine-type boilers in future vessels.

The ships' engines were rated at 10,000 metric horsepower (9,900 ihp) for a top speed of 19.5 knots (36.1 km/h; 22.4 mph) for the first three ships and 18.5 knots (34.3 km/h; 21.3 mph) for the last two vessels. As built, the ships carried up to 950 t (930 long tons; 1,050 short tons) of coal, which gave them a cruising range of 3,412 nautical miles (6,319 km; 3,926 mi) at a speed of 12 knots (22 km/h; 14 mph). The more efficient Marine-type boilers installed in 1905–1911 increased cruising range to 3,840 nmi (7,110 km; 4,420 mi) at the same speed. Victoria Louise and Hertha were equipped with four electricity generators with a combined output of 224 to 271 kilowatts (300 to 363 hp) at 110 Volts; the last three ships had three generators with a total output of 169 to 183 kW (227 to 245 hp) at 110 V.

=== Armament and armor ===
Vineta in dry dock in 1901; note her torpedo tube directly below the ram bow

The ships' primary armament consisted of two 21 cm SK L/40 C/97 built-up guns in single gun turrets, one forward and one aft. The turrets were C/97 type mounts, which were hydraulically operated and hand-loaded. The turrets had a range of elevation from -5 to 30 degrees, and at maximum elevation, they had a range of 16,300 m (53,500 ft). Muzzle velocity was 780 m/s (2,600 ft/s). The guns were supplied with 58 rounds of ammunition each; these were 238 kg (525 lb) projectiles, and were divided between 48 common shells and 10 solid-steel rounds. The guns had a theoretical rate of fire of three shells per minute, which gun crews aboard Freya achieved during shooting practice in 1902, but likely could not be maintained in combat.

Eight 15 cm SK L/40 guns rounded out the offensive gun armament. Four of these guns were mounted in turrets amidships and the other four were placed in casemates. These guns fired armor-piercing shells at a rate of 4 to 5 per minute. The guns could depress to −7 degrees and elevate to 20 degrees, for a maximum range of 13,700 m (14,990 yd). The shells weighed 51 kg (112 lb) and were fired at a muzzle velocity of 735 m/s (2,410 ft/s). The casemate guns were manually elevated and trained, while the turrets were operated electrically. The secondary battery was supplied with four types of projectiles: each gun received 63 common shells, 42 high explosive shells, 10 solid rounds, and 5 shrapnel shells.

For defense against torpedo boats, the ships also carried ten 8.8 cm SK L/30 naval guns, and an eleventh was added during the modernization. These were also mounted individually in casemates and pivot mounts. These guns fired 7.04 kg (15.5 lb) shell at a muzzle velocity of 590 mps (1,936 fps). Their rate of fire was approximately 15 shells per minute; the guns could engage targets out to 6,890 m (7,530 yd). The gun mounts were manually operated. The gun armament was rounded out by ten 3.7 cm Maxim machine cannon.

The ships were also equipped with three 45 cm (17.7 in) torpedo tubes with eight torpedoes, two launchers were mounted on the broadside and the third was in the bow, all below the waterline. These weapons were 5.1 m (201 in) long and carried an 87.5 kg (193 lb) TNT warhead. They could be set at two speeds for different ranges. At 26 knots (48 km/h; 30 mph), the torpedoes had a range of 800 m (870 yd). At an increased speed of 32 knots (59 km/h; 37 mph), the range was reduced to 500 m (550 yd).

Armor protection for the ships was composed of Krupp steel. The main deck was 40 mm (1.6 in) thick with 100 mm (3.9 in) thick slopes. The forward conning tower had 150 mm (5.9 in) thick sides and a 30 mm (1.2 in) thick roof. The aft conning tower was given only splinter protection, with just 12 mm (0.47 in) thick sides. The 21 cm and 15 cm gun turrets had 100 mm thick sides and 30 mm thick roofs. The casemate guns were also given 100 mm worth of armor protection. The ships were also equipped with cork cofferdams.

=== Modifications ===
Early in her career, while serving in the gunnery training school, Vineta received a trainable torpedo tube on the starboard broadside position for testing purposes. It could be trained along an arc from 45 degrees to 70 degrees from the centerline. The mount proved to be unsuccessful, and it was not employed on other warships.

Between 1905 and 1909, all five ships of the class underwent a modernization that included removing the heavy military mast to reduce topweight, which improved their handling in turns. All ships of the class except Freya received new Navy-type boilers and had their funnels reduced to two. Two of the 15 cm guns and all of the Maxim guns were removed, owing to the increased size and power of the latest torpedo boats and destroyers, which greatly reduced the utility of the light weapons. An eleventh 8.8 cm SK L/30 gun was installed, along with three 8.8 cm SK L/35 guns, so gun crews could be trained on both types.

Freya was refitted again in 1911–13, and at that time, received the new boilers and had her funnels reduced. In 1912, Victoria Louise received a large flying bridge, the only member of the class to receive the feature. In 1916, all of the ships of the class were disarmed, with the exception of Freya, which was re-equipped with a single 15 cm gun, four 10.5 cm SK L/45 guns, and fourteen 8.8 cm guns of both the L/30 and L/35 versions, for use as a gunnery training ship. In April 1918, her torpedo tubes were removed. By that time, her gun armament had been revised to two 15 cm guns and four 10.5 cm guns.

== Construction ==
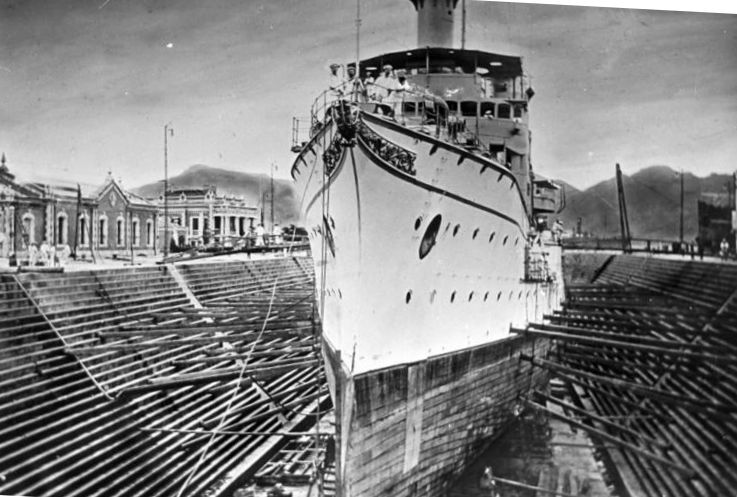
Hansa in drydock at AG Vulcan

Ship	Builder	Laid down	Launched	Commissioned
Victoria Louise	AG Weser, Bremen	8 or 9 April 1896 (Note: The historian Dirk Nottelmann provides the keel laying date as 8 April, while Hans Hildebrand, Albert Röhr, and Hans-Otto Steinmetz state 9 April.)	29 March 1897	20 February 1899
Hertha	AG Vulcan, Stettin	15 February 1896	14 April 1897	23 July 1898
Freya	Kaiserliche Werft, Danzig	2 January 1896	27 April 1897	20 October 1898
Vineta	Kaiserliche Werft, Danzig	10 August 1896	9 December 1897	13 September 1899
Hansa	AG Vulcan, Stettin	23 July 1896	12 March 1898	20 April 1899

== Service history ==
=== Victoria Louise ===
Victoria Louise served with the fleet in home waters for the first seven years of her career. During this time, she was assigned to I Battle Squadron, part of the Heimatflotte (Home Fleet), and she took part in routine peacetime training exercises. During some of the fleet maneuvers, she served as the flagship for squadron commanders. She represented Germany during the funeral of Queen Victoria in 1901. The ship was transferred to I Scouting Group, the fleet's reconnaissance unit, in 1903. Later that year, she participated in a cruise to Spain.

In 1906, she was modernized and after 1908, used as a training ship for naval cadets. In 1909, she visited the United States, and at the outbreak of World War I, was mobilized into V Scouting Group. While patrolling in the eastern Baltic Sea, she was attacked unsuccessfully by the British submarine HMS E1 in October 1914, the only time a ship of the class encountered enemy forces during the war. The incident in part prompted the naval command to withdraw the five Victoria Louises from active service later in October. She was used as a mine storage hulk and barracks ship based in Danzig for the rest of the war. Victoria Louise was sold in 1919 and converted into a freighter the following year, though she served in this capacity until 1923, when she was broken up for scrap.

=== Hertha ===
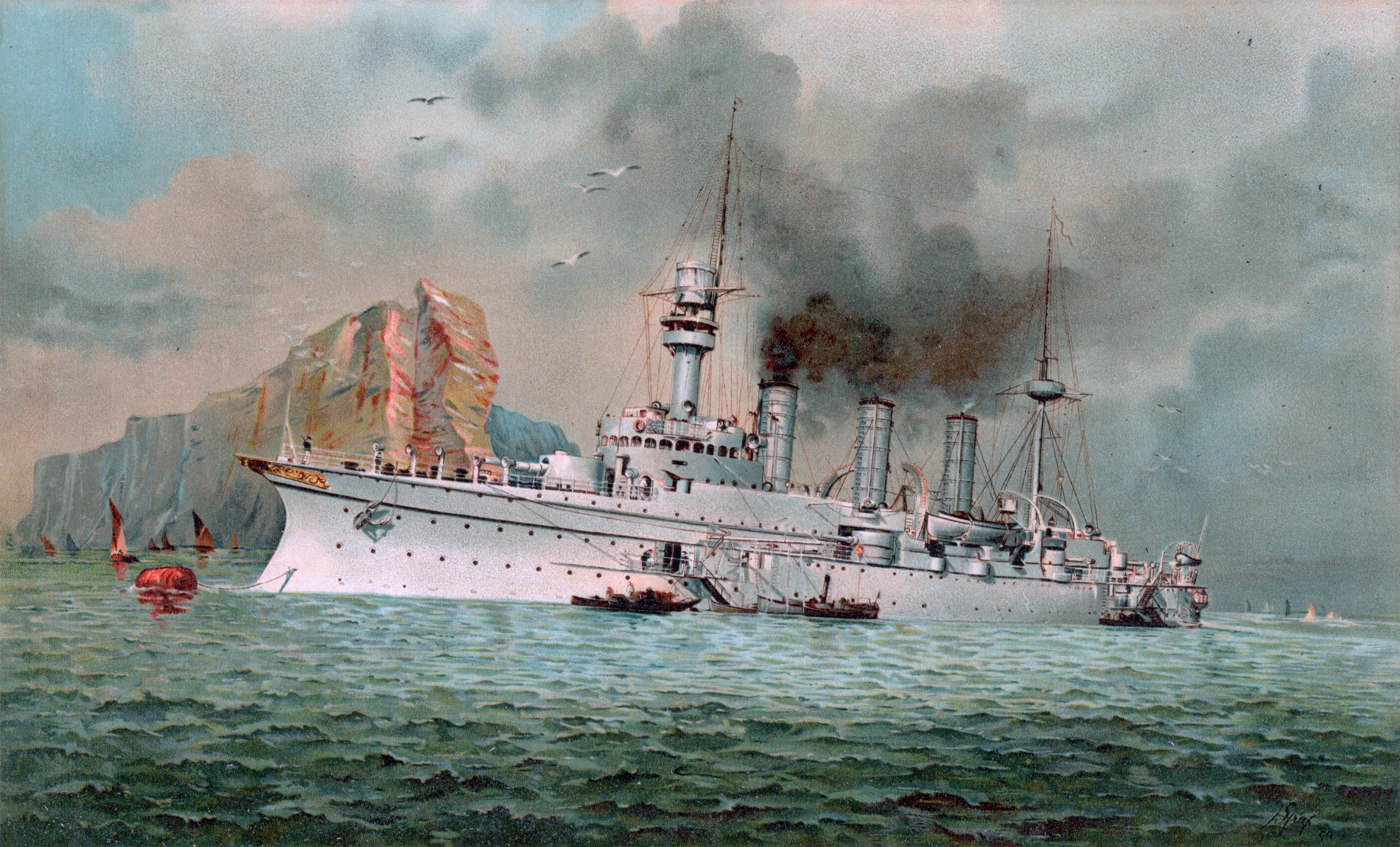
A 1902 lithograph of Hertha

The ship's first major operation was a cruise to the Mediterranean Sea to escort Kaiser Wilhelm II's yacht, Hohenzollern; while there, Hertha received orders to join the East Asia Squadron. She operated there for the first six years of her career, and during that time, she served briefly as the Squadron flagship in 1900. Her crew saw significant action during the Boxer Uprising in 1900; Hertha contributed landing parties to the Seymour Expedition and to the force that captured the Taku Forts. The following four years passed peacefully for the ship, but by late 1904 she was in need of a thorough overhaul that necessitated a return to Germany.

After arriving in Germany in 1905, she was modernized and used as a training ship in 1908, following the completion of the refit. Hertha made several training cruises over the following years, including a visit to the United States for the Hudson–Fulton Celebration in 1909. She cruised with the Mediterranean Division in 1912 and into early 1913. She thereafter made another cruise to the Americas, with the primary goal of protecting German interests during the Mexican Revolution. Hertha was notably the last German warship to visit Britain before the start of war in July 1914. At the outbreak of World War I, Hertha was mobilized into V Scouting Group, but served in front-line duty only briefly. She was used as a barracks ship after 1915, and ultimately sold for scrapping in 1920.

=== Freya ===
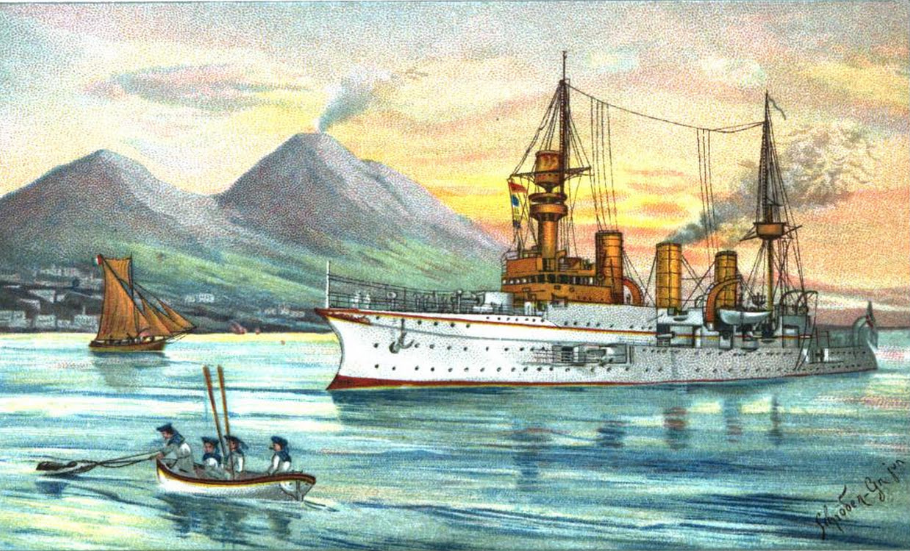
Illustration of Freya overseas, c. 1901

Freya served as a gunnery training ship for the German fleet for the initial years of her career, unlike her sister ships, all of which served abroad on foreign stations. In addition, her Niclausse boilers proved to be troublesome throughout her career, which reduced her usefulness on foreign stations, where maintenance facilities were less available. Her poorly performing boilers nevertheless convinced the naval command to standardize on proven types, and eventually develop its own system. As a result, she led a fairly uneventful career; in addition to conducting shooting practice, she also participated in training exercises with the fleet between 1901 and 1904. After a modernization in 1905–1907, Freya was used as a school ship for cadets, and over the next several years embarked on training cruises. During a voyage to Canada in 1908, she accidentally rammed and sank a Canadian schooner, killing nine sailors.

Two major cruises to the Mediterranean took place in 1908 and 1909, and in 1910, Freya crossed the Atlantic to visit Mexico, along with islands in the Caribbean Sea. Another major refit followed between 1911 and 1913, after which she finally had her problematic boilers replaced, but she was then placed in the reserve fleet. At the outbreak of World War I, Freya was mobilized into V Scouting Group, but served in front-line duty only briefly. An accident involving one of her torpedo tubes nearly sank the ship just days after she was recommissioned and killed two men. Briefly decommissioned for repairs, she was reactivated for further use as a training ship, a role she filled until the end of the war. She was ultimately sold for scrapping in 1921.

=== Vineta ===
Vineta served abroad in the American Station for the first several years of her career to protect German interests in the region. During her deployment in the Americas, she participated in the Venezuela Crisis of 1902–1903 and shelled several Venezuelan fortresses, including the bombardment of Fort San Carlos. Notably, the ship suffered an ammunition fire during the cruise, which informed the navy about the instability of its propellant charges, leading to reformulation that spared several German warships from destruction during battles in World War I. Vineta returned to Germany in 1905, by way of the country's colonies in German South West Africa and German West Africa. She was used as a torpedo training ship from 1906 to 1908.

She was modernized in 1909–1911, after which she was used as a training ship for naval cadets, conducting training cruises in the early 1910s. In November 1912, while cruising in the Mediterranean Sea, she participated in an international naval protest of the First Balkan War. During another training voyage to the Caribbean Sea in early 1914, she embarked the deposed Haitian president Michel Oreste as he fled into exile. At the outbreak of World War I later in 1914, Vineta was mobilized into V Scouting Group, but served in front-line duty only briefly. She was used as a barracks ship after 1915, and ultimately sold for scrapping in 1920.

=== Hansa ===
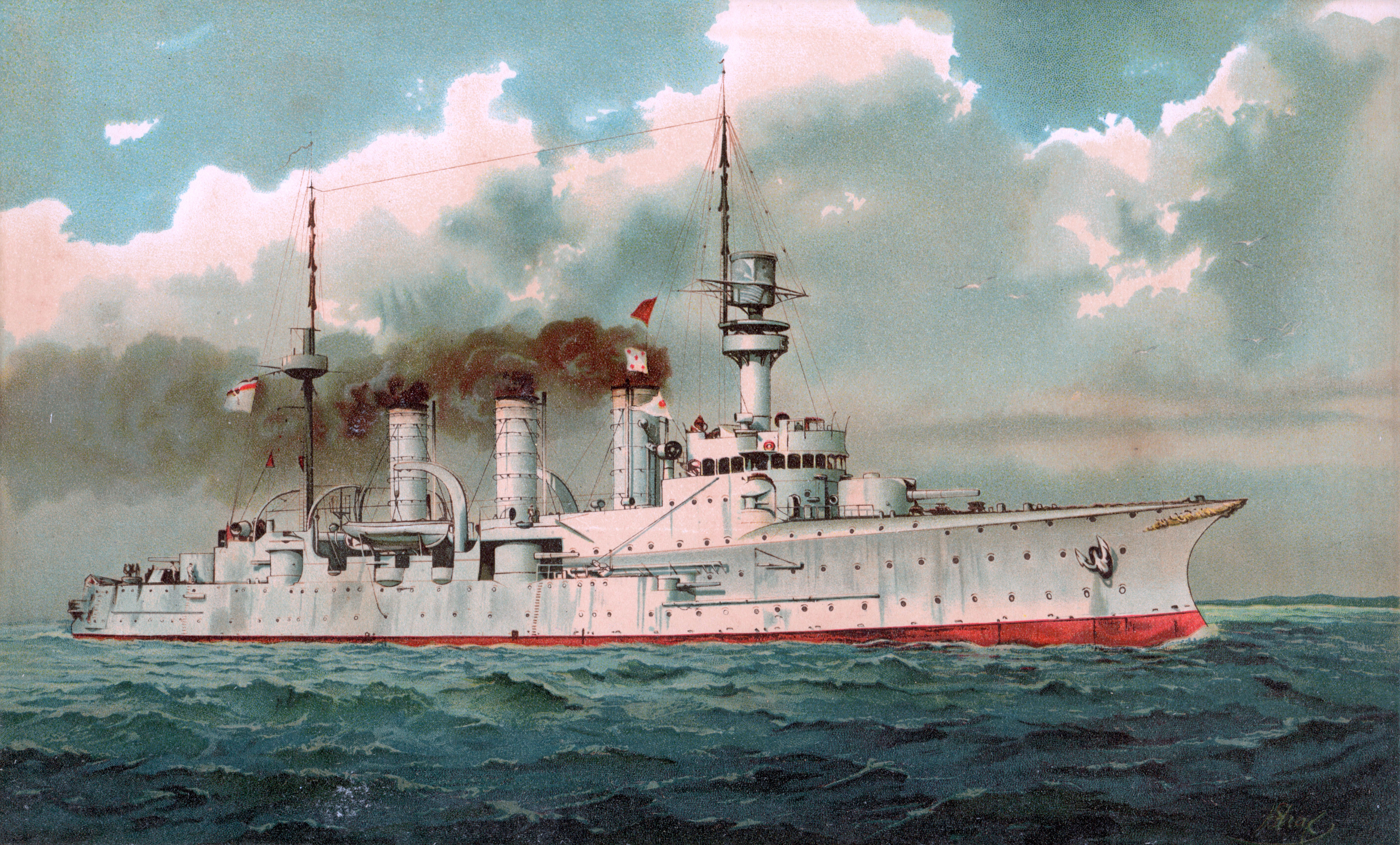
Lithograph of Hansa in 1902

Hansa served abroad in the East Asia Squadron for the first six years of her career, and during the first few years of this deployment, she served as the deputy commander's flagship. She saw action during the Boxer Uprising in Qing China in 1900, contributing a landing party to the force that captured the Taku Forts and the subsequent Seymour Expedition. Over the next four years, she toured the region, visiting numerous ports from Japan to Australia. In 1903, during a visit to Japan, Emperor Meiji came aboard the ship in a naval review. At the start of the Russo-Japanese War in February 1904, Hansa evacuated German nationals from Korea, the primary location of the fighting. In August, she participated in the internment of the Russian pre-dreadnought battleship Tsesarevich after the Battle of the Yellow Sea.

After returning to Germany in 1906, she was modernized and used as a training ship in 1909, following the completion of the refit. Over the next few years, she embarked on numerous training cruises, including a major voyage to the Mediterranean Sea in 1909–1910 and two to the United States in 1911–1912 and 1913. A final overseas voyage to the Mediterranean ended in March 1914, and the outbreak of World War I in July interrupted her next planned training cruise. Instead, she joined her sisters in V Scouting Group, serving as its flagship, but she served in front-line duty only briefly. She was used as a barracks ship after 1915, and ultimately sold for scrapping in 1920.
