= SMS Kaiserin Augusta =

Protected cruiser of the German Imperial Navy

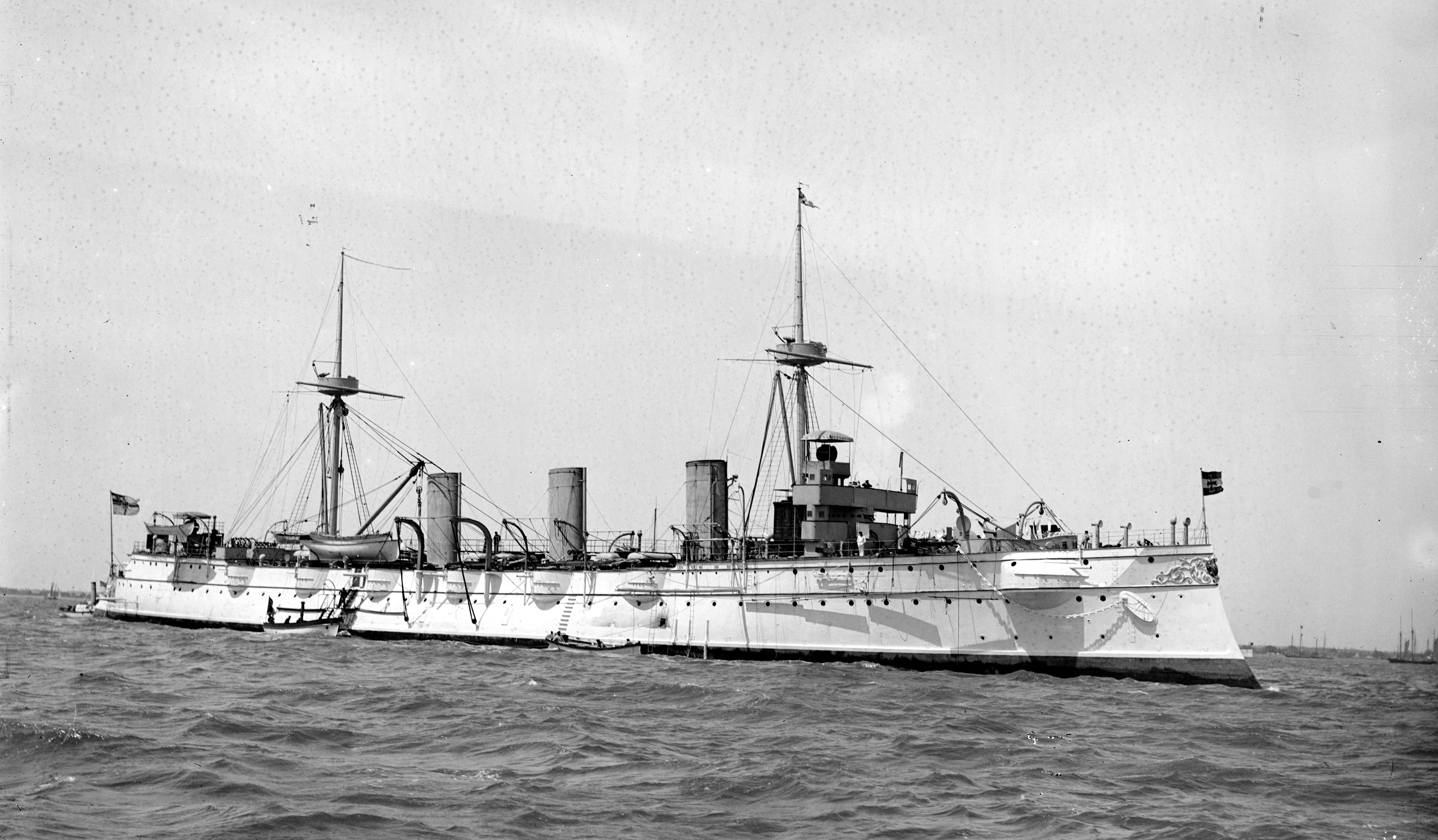
- SMS Kaiserin Augusta in 1893

Class overview
- Preceded by: Irene class
- Succeeded by: Victoria Louise class

History

German Empire
- Name: Kaiserin Augusta
- Namesake: Empress Augusta
- Builder: Germaniawerft, Kiel
- Laid down: 1890
- Launched: 15 January 1892
- Commissioned: 17 November 1892
- Decommissioned: 14 December 1918
- Stricken: 1 October 1919
- Fate: Scrapped 1920

General characteristics
- Class & type: Protected cruiser
- Displacement: Normal: 6,056 t (5,960 long tons); Full load: 6,318 t (6,218 long tons)
- Length: 123.2 m (404 ft) oa
- Beam: 15.6 m (51 ft)
- Draft: 6.48 m (21.3 ft)
- Installed power: 8 × fire-tube boilers; 12,000 PS (8,800 kW)
- Propulsion: 3 × triple-expansion steam engines; 3 × screw propellers
- Speed: 21 knots (38.9 km/h)
- Range: 3,240 nmi (6,000 km; 3,730 mi) at 12 kn (22 km/h; 14 mph)
- Complement: 13 officers; 417 enlisted men
- Armament: 4 × 15 cm (5.9 in) RK L/30 guns; 8 × 10.5 cm (4.1 in) SK L/35 guns; 8 × 8.8 cm (3.5 in) SK L/30 guns; 4 × machine gun; 5 × 35 cm (13.8 in) torpedo tubes
- Armor: Deck: 50 to 70 mm (2.0 to 2.8 in); Conning tower: 50 mm

SMS Kaiserin Augusta was a unique protected cruiser, built for the German Kaiserliche Marine (Imperial Navy) in the early 1890s. Named for Empress Augusta, who died in January 1890, she was laid down in 1890, launched in January 1892, and completed in November of that year. Owing to budgetary restrictions, Kaiserin Augusta was designed to fill both fleet scout and colonial cruiser roles. The ship was initially armed with a main battery of four 15 cm (5.9 in) and eight 10.5 cm (4.1 in) guns, which by 1896 was replaced with twelve new model 15 cm guns. She was the first ship in the German Navy to feature a three-shaft propeller arrangement.

Kaiserin Augusta served abroad between 1897 and 1902, primarily in the East Asia Squadron under the command of Admiral Otto von Diederichs. During this time, the ship's crew assisted in the suppression of the Boxer Uprising in 1900. In 1902, she returned to Germany for an extensive overhaul that lasted until 1907, after which she went into reserve. Following the outbreak of World War I in 1914, Kaiserin Augusta was mobilized to serve as a gunnery training ship. She served in this role throughout the war; the ship was ultimately sold for scrapping in October 1919 and broken up the following year.

== Background ==
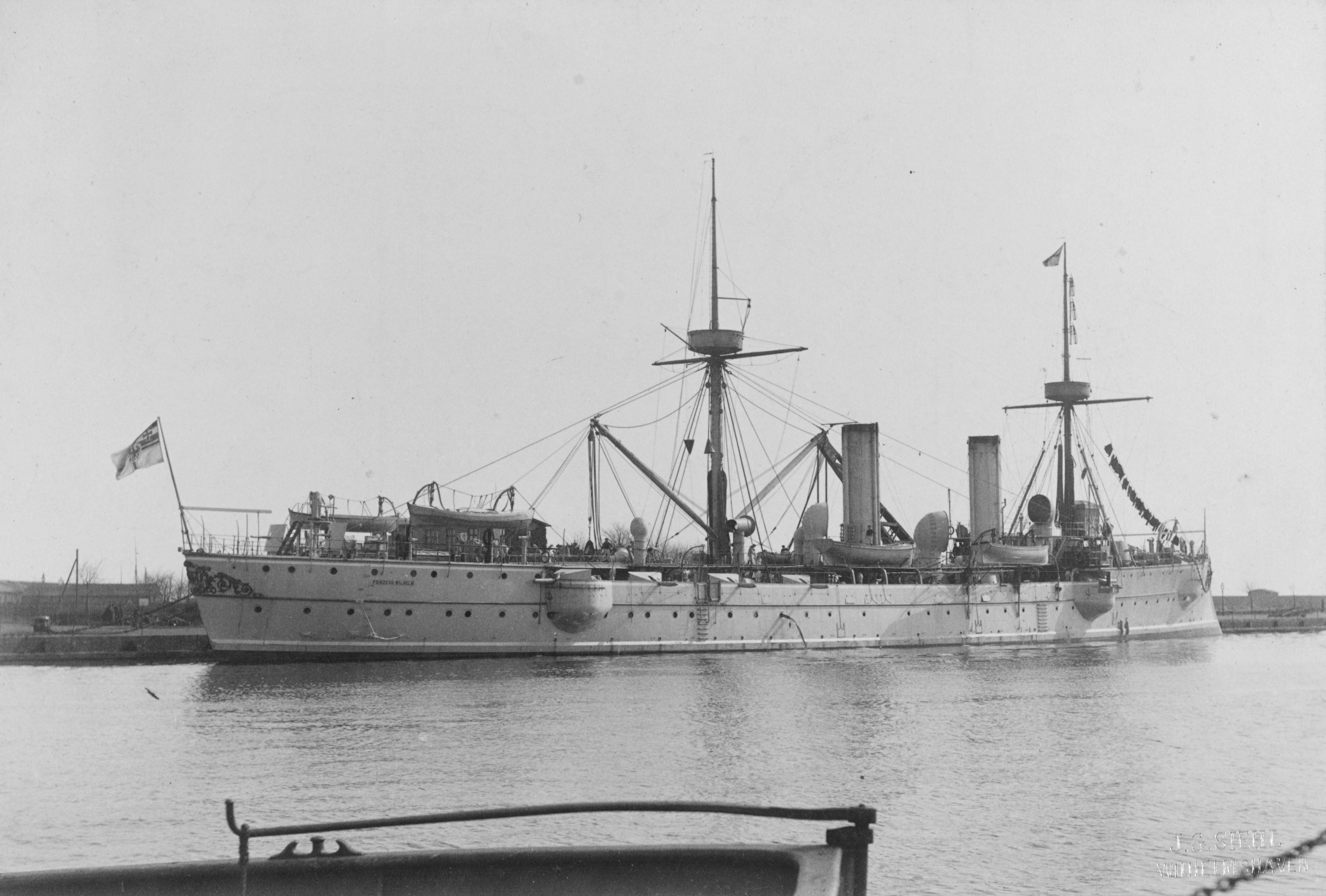
SMS Prinzess Wilhelm of the Irene class, which provided the basis for the initial version of the Kaiserin Augusta design

Design work on Kaiserin Augusta began in 1887 and was completed in 1889. At the time, the Chief of the Kaiserliche Admiralität (Imperial Admiralty), General Leo von Caprivi, favored a fleet of cruisers to defend German maritime interests. Caprivi, who was supported by then-prince Wilhelm, believed that such vessels should, first and foremost, have powerful engines capable of propelling them at great speed. Guns of medium caliber and light armor protection were necessary to make the ships effective combat vessels, and an impressive appearance would enhance the ability of the vessels to "show the flag". New cruisers would be needed to scout for the main battle fleet and to patrol Germany's growing colonial empire. Unlike the British Royal Navy, which had the funding and resources to build specialized scouts and overseas cruisers, budgetary restrictions forced the German Navy to design ships that could fulfill both roles.

Up to the mid-1880s, German cruising vessels were primarily intended for overseas service or training duties; the Bismarck and Carola classes of screw corvettes had little fighting value, and the corvettes Nixe and Charlotte were purely training vessels. In 1886, the two Irene-class protected cruisers were laid down; these were the first modern cruisers of the German fleet. Senior naval officers debated the type of cruiser that should be built next. Vizeadmiral (VAdm—Vice Admiral) Alexander von Monts and VAdm Wilhelm von Wickede, the Chiefs of the Marinestation der Nordsee (North Sea Naval Station) and the Marinestation der Ostsee (Baltic Sea Naval Station), respectively, favored building a pure fleet scout for the next large cruiser. Caprivi, supported by the Admiralty Council, supported the idea of building a cruiser that placed more of an emphasis on overseas cruising, which would have been a repeat of the Irene class, albeit with less armor protection. Caprivi was of the belief that German cruisers should only be used for commerce raiding, and had no need for armor protection.

For the 1889 fiscal year, approved in early 1888, the Reichstag (Imperial Diet) approved the construction of a new cruiser, under the designation "H". Work on the design had already begun in May 1887. Kapitän zur See (KzS—Captain at Sea) Friedrich von Hollmann argued that the new cruiser (of which he believed should be the first of four such vessels) should be capable of not only commerce destruction, but also battle with enemy cruisers and engaging with coastal defenses on foreign stations. Caprivi's faction prevailed initially, but Caprivi resigned in July 1888 following the ascension of the now-Kaiser Wilhelm II. Caprivi and Wilhelm had starkly different views about how the fleet should be oriented, and Caprivi tendered his resignation; Monts replaced him as the admiralty chief. He immediately stopped design work on the vessel and instructed the design staff to prepare a new vessel that could be an effective reconnaissance ship for the main fleet.

== Design ==
Line-drawing of Kaiserin Augusta

Wilhelm II overruled Caprivi's decision on omitting armor protection, instructing that an armor deck must be incorporated into the new ship. Chief Constructor Alfred Dietrich carried out work on the new design. The top speed of the new cruiser, 20 knots (37 km/h; 23 mph), required an elongated hull compared to the Irenes, since the longer, finer hull had improved hydrodynamic efficiency. In this effort, Dietrich was limited by the size of existing dry docks and other port infrastructure. Higher speed came at the cost of reduced maneuverability, which would hamper the ship's ability to fight in a fleet action. Further changes were incorporated, including strengthening the armament, which further delayed the commencement of work on the ship.

Dietrich continued to work on the revised design through late 1888, one of the chief difficulties being the necessary improvements to the propulsion system to retain the desired top speed. The larger, heavier ship would require around 50% more horsepower compared to Irene's propulsion system. The armor deck complicated arrangement of the engines, since mounting vertical engines of the required power needed to reach 20 knots on two shafts would have necessitated a heavy glacis to extend the armor deck over the engine rooms. As a result, Dietrich was forced to adopt a three-shaft arrangement, so that the necessary power output could be divided between three smaller engines; the result was the first major warship in the world to use three screws. At the same time, the French had also decided on the arrangement for the armored cruiser Dupuy de Lôme, but Kaiserin Augusta would be completed first. While it solved the propulsion system arrangement problem, the three-shaft system also improved the handling characteristics of the ship. The arrangement proved to be successful and was repeated with the Kaiser Friedrich III-class battleships.

The armament was also an issue to be solved while the design was refined. The naval command initially rejected the 15 cm (5.9 in) RK L/30 gun, which was incapable of penetrating deck armor. Since quick-firing guns had been developed up to 10.5 cm (4.1 in) caliber, the design staff initially opted to standardize on a battery of twelve 10.5 cm SK L/35 guns, on the basis that the much-faster-firing guns could smother a target and destroy unarmored sections of the enemy ship. But as the new ship was enlarged, the designers reverted to the larger, but slower 15 cm guns, despite their disadvantages. By 1891, the new 15 cm SK L/35 gun had been developed, and Dietrich modified the design for Kaiserin Augusta—construction of which had already begun—to incorporate the much-improved weapon. These guns had not been produced in sufficient numbers to equip Kaiserin Augusta by the time she was completed, and so she was armed with a mixture of the old 15 cm and 10.5 cm guns.

Kaiserin Augusta was in essence an enlarged version of the aviso Greif, with increased speed, a more powerful main battery, and heavier armor.

=== General characteristics and machinery ===
Kaiserin Augusta, date unknown

Kaiserin Augusta was 122.2 meters (400 ft 11 in) long at the waterline and 123.2 m (404 ft 2 in) overall. She had a beam of 15.6 m (51 ft 2 in) and a draft of 6.48 m (21 ft 3 in) forward and 7.4 m (24 ft 3 in) aft. She was designed to displace 6,056 metric tons (5,960 long tons), and at full combat load the displacement increased to 6,318 t (6,218 long tons). Her hull was constructed with transverse and longitudinal steel frames; the outer wall consisted of a single layer of timber planks covered with Muntz metal sheathing to protect the wood from fouling. The hull contained ten watertight compartments and a double bottom that ran for 55 percent of the length of the vessel. The ship's superstructure was fairly minimal, consisting of a small conning tower with a bridge erected atop it. Kaiserin Augusta was nearly flush decked; the upper deck terminated shortly before the stern, where it stepped down to a quarterdeck. She was fitted with two pole masts equipped with fighting tops.

Kaiserin Augusta's crew consisted of 13 officers and 417 enlisted men. She carried several smaller boats, including two picket boats, one launch, one pinnace, two cutters, two yawls, and two dinghies. The ship suffered from severe pitch and roll, though these effects were reduced in heavy winds and a beam sea. The forecastle shipped excessive amounts of water in a head sea. The ship maneuvered poorly, though this was improved at high speed. The transverse metacentric height was 0.78 m (2 ft 7 in). The ship vibrated excessively at high speeds, earning her the nickname "cocktail shaker"; this was most likely the result of placing the propeller shafts too close to the hull.

The ship was powered by three 3-cylinder triple-expansion steam engines built by AG Germania; each drove a screw that was 4.5 m (14 ft 9 in) in diameter. Each engine had its own separate engine room; the central engine was arranged vertically, but the outboard engines were placed horizontally to keep the armor deck as low as possible. The engines were supplied with steam by eight cylindrical double fire-tube boilers split into three boiler rooms. The boilers were ducted into three funnels. Kaiserin Augusta was equipped with four electrical generators providing 48 kilowatts at 67 volts. Steering was controlled by a single rudder.

The engines were rated at 12,000 metric horsepower (11,840 ihp) and a top speed of 21 knots (39 km/h; 24 mph), though on trials they reached a half knot better at 14,015 PS (13,823 ihp) during a 6-hour test. Figures for her 1-hour forced draft test are missing from the navy's surviving records, but non-official contemporary sources credit Kaiserin Augusta with speeds of up to 22.5 knots (41.7 km/h; 25.9 mph). The recorded speed of 21.5 knots rendered her one of the fastest cruisers in the world at the time, and she was the fastest ship in the German fleet at the time of her completion. Coal storage amounted to 700 t (690 long tons; 770 short tons), and at a cruising speed of 12 knots (22 km/h; 14 mph), the ship could steam for 3,240 nautical miles (6,000 km; 3,730 mi). Another 110 t (110 long tons; 120 short tons) could be carried elsewhere without negatively affecting stability, which would extend her cruising radius.

=== Armament ===
As built, Kaiserin Augusta was initially armed with a main battery of four 15 cm K L/30 guns with a total of 292 rounds of ammunition. This was supported by a secondary battery of eight 10.5 cm SK L/35 guns with 777 rounds of ammunition. She also carried eight 8.8 cm (3.5 in) SK L/30 guns with 1,361 rounds of ammunition and four machine guns. The medium-caliber 15 cm and 10.5 cm guns were mounted in sponsoned casemates in the main deck of the ship. The ship was also equipped with five 35 cm (13.8 in) torpedo tubes with thirteen torpedoes; four were placed in swivel mounts on the broadside and one was placed in the bow, below the waterline. In 1893–1895, during a refit to correct defects in her construction, her armament was updated; the old 15 cm and 10.5 cm guns were replaced with twelve 15 cm SK L/35 guns that had a maximum range of 12,600 m (41,300 ft). The guns were supplied with a total of 1,064 shells; like the previous battery, these guns were placed in casemates in the hull. After 1907, the swivel-mounted torpedo tubes were removed, leaving only the tube in the bow with three torpedoes.

=== Armor ===
The ship's armor consisted primarily of a curved armor deck of Krupp steel, which sloped downward at the sides to meet the hull 1.5 m (4 ft 11 in) below the waterline. The flat portion 50 mm (2 in) thick on the flat portion. The deck increased in thickness to 75 mm (3 in) on the sides where they covered the propulsion machinery spaces, but the sides were reduced to 50 mm further forward and aft. At the bow, the deck armor extended down to reinforce the bow so that it could be used for ramming attacks. The conning tower had 50 mm thick sides and a 20 mm (0.79 in) thick roof. Below the conning tower, a communication tube that received 100 mm (3.9 in) of steel armor protected the steering gear leads and the voice tubes that relayed commands from the bridge. The 8.8 cm guns were fitted with 12 mm (0.47 in) gun shields.

== Service history ==
=== Construction – 1896 ===
Kaiserin Augusta leaving New York, from an 1895 lithograph

The keel for Kaiserin Augusta was laid down at the Germaniawerft shipyard in Kiel in May 1890. She was launched on 15 January 1892, and at the ceremony the vessel was christened Kaiserin Augusta by Prince Heinrich of Prussia, the grandson of the ship's namesake, Empress Augusta. The ship, completed with her provisional armament, was commissioned to begin sea trials less than a year later on 17 November 1892. The trials were interrupted by the need to send modern cruisers to represent Germany at a celebration of Christopher Columbus's first voyage across the Atlantic Ocean. Celebrations in Genoa, Italy, earlier that year prompted negative remarks over the German representative, the protected cruiser Prinzess Wilhelm. As a result, Kaiserin Augusta's trials were interrupted in early 1893 to send her and the unprotected cruiser Seeadler to New York City in the United States for the ceremonies. Kaiserin Augusta left Kiel on 29 March under the command of KzS Wilhelm Büchsel and met Seeadler in Halifax, Canada. There, Kaiserin Augusta took Seeadler in tow, the latter vessel having run out of coal. The two ships reached Hampton Roads, US on 26 April, where Kaiserin Augusta made a significant impression, having achieved an average speed of 21.5 knots (39.8 km/h; 24.7 mph) on her crossing of the Atlantic. The ships then proceeded to New York for the celebrations before departing on 13 May. Seeadler returned to German East Africa while Kaiserin Augusta re-crossed the Atlantic, arriving in Kiel on 2 June.

The voyage had revealed structural problems with the ship, and so she was decommissioned for modifications on 21 June. During this period, her standard armament was installed as well. Work was completed by mid-1894, but Kaiserin Augusta's engines broke down during initial trials and had to be rebuilt completely. Repairs were not finished until early 1895, and she was finally ready to be recommissioned on 3 April. Further trials followed, and on 9 May she accidentally ran aground in the Kieler Förde. She was pulled free by the old ironclad Baden and some shipyard tugboats. After repairs were completed, she participated in the opening ceremonies for the Kaiser Wilhelm Canal on 21 June. She led a group of twenty-one unarmored ships, in company with the four Brandenburg-class battleships, the four Sachsen-class ironclads, and four of the Siegfried-class coastal defense ships.

Two German merchants had been murdered in Morocco; the protected cruiser Irene had been sent to secure an indemnity, but the German government determined that the amount Morocco had agreed to pay was insufficient. In July, the Navy sent Kaiserin Augusta, under the command of KzS Oscar von Schuckmann to seek a larger payment; she was joined there by the steam corvettes Marie and Stosch and the coastal defense ship Hagen. I Squadron, which was on a training cruise in the Mediterranean Sea, extended their cruise so that it would also be in the region to apply pressure on the Moroccan government. Schuckmann participated in the negotiations, along with the German ambassador. The German gunboat diplomacy was successful and achieved its aims, but the operation was heavily criticized, especially in Britain, where anti-German sentiment was beginning to rise. Kaiserin Augusta left Tangier on 5 August and arrived in German waters on 18 August, where she joined the annual fleet maneuvers. On 20 December, she finally completed sea trials, and three days later was assigned as a guard ship in Wilhelmshaven. While there, she also served as a training vessel for engine room personnel. From 10 March 1896, Kaiserin Augusta escorted Wilhelm II's yacht Hohenzollern on a cruise in the Mediterranean that lasted until 1 May. From late June to 8 November, the ship was occupied with extensive individual and squadron training exercises.

=== 1897 – 1902 ===
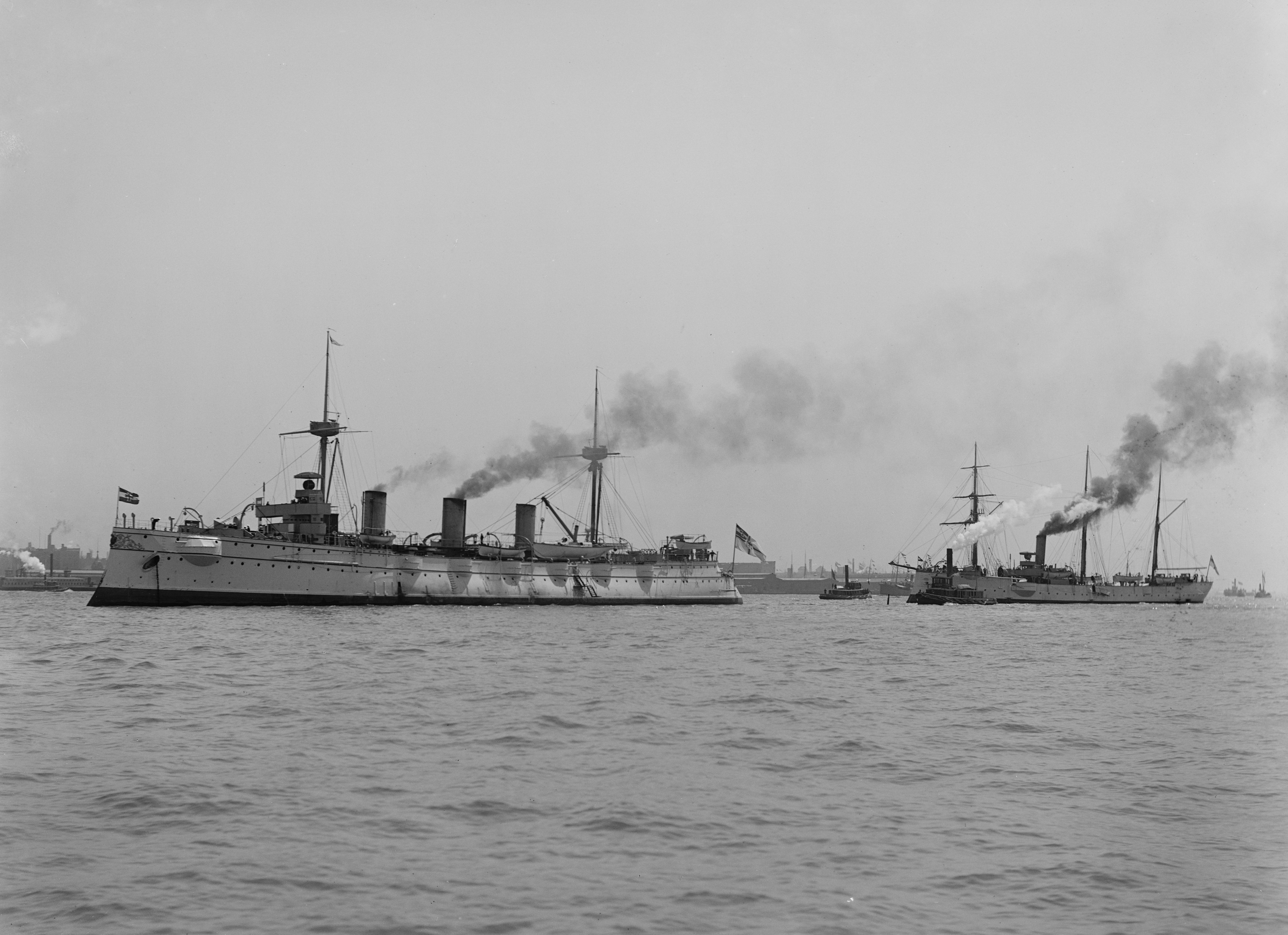
Kaiserin Augusta with Seeadler in New York City, 1893

In February 1897, an international naval demonstration took place off Crete to protest Greece's attempted annexation of the island and prevent another Greco-Turkish war. Kaiserin Augusta was the sole German contribution to the International Squadron, receiving orders to join the fleet on 6 February and arriving in Souda Bay on 21 February. Korvettenkapitän (KK—Corvette Captain) Leopold Koellner, the ship's commander, was under orders to act on his own discretion, but also in accordance with the warships of the other Great Powers. Kaiserin Augusta and other vessels shelled Greek volunteers that were attacking Chania on 21 February. On 15 March, she sent fifty men ashore to reinforce the international landing party that had gone ashore to stop the fighting. The ship operated as part of a "Light Division", along with the Italian torpedo cruiser Caprera, the Austro-Hungarian cruiser Tiger, the French destroyer Faucon, and the Russian gunboat Grosjaschtschi. The ships were tasked with blocking Greek attacks on the area around Souda Bay; for her efforts in stopping their attacks, the Greek volunteers nicknamed her "the damned white ship".

Despite the efforts of the Great Powers, the Greco-Turkish War of 1897 broke out on 17 April. Ottoman successes in the conflict threatened to provoke a revolution in Greece, and so the International Squadron sent most of its ships, including Kaiserin Augusta, to Piraeus in an attempt to stabilize the country. On 8 November, Kaiserin Augusta went to Smyrna in the Ottoman Empire, where she received orders to go to East Asia. The ship returned to Crete on 19 November to retrieve her landing party before embarking on the voyage to Asia. Immediately following the seizure of the Jiaozhou Bay Leased Territory in China, Admiral Otto von Diederichs, the commander of the East Asia Squadron, requested reinforcements to secure the new colonial territory; he specifically asked for Kaiserin Augusta, along with additional ground troops to garrison the port. The ship was joined by the cruisers Deutschland and Gefion, which carried the III Seebataillon, and Cormoran. As Kaiserin Augusta had been stationed in the Mediterranean, she arrived first, on 30 December.

Kaiserin Augusta remained in Qingdao in the Jiaozhou concession until mid-March 1898, when she left to visit the British colony at Hong Kong. She thereafter went on a cruise in the Yellow Sea and visited Nagasaki, Japan, where Diederichs temporarily came aboard the vessel. Beginning in November, KzS Ernst Gülich served as the ship's commander. Following the outbreak of the Spanish–American War in 1898, Diederichs was ordered to proceed to the Philippines, where Commodore George Dewey had defeated a Spanish squadron commanded by Rear Admiral Patricio Montojo. Diederichs was instructed to protect local German interests, and if possible, seize another colonial concession in the Philippines. With his ships dispersed on various colonial missions or under repair, Diederichs initially concentrated his forces slowly; he recalled Kaiserin Augusta to serve as his flagship while the rest of the force assembled. After the end of the Battle of Manila, Kaiserin Augusta steamed to Hong Kong on 13 August, arriving two days later. There the ship notified Berlin of the defeat of the Spanish garrison. She also carried the former Governor General of the Philippines, Basilio Augustín, out of Manila.

In October, the ship brought a detachment of infantry to Taku at the request of the German ambassador to China. The men then traveled overland to Beijing to guard the German legation there. On 23 November, Kaiserin Augusta participated in the erection ceremony for the Iltis monument in Shanghai, China that commemorated the men killed in the wrecking of the gunboat Iltis. She thereafter returned to Qingdao and went on tours of Chinese and Japanese waters for the rest of the year. On 27 February 1899, the ship was reclassified as a "Grosser Kreuzer" (Large Cruiser). The rest of the year passed uneventfully; in October she went to Weihaiwei for an overhaul that lasted until 5 February 1900. In late March, the Boxer Uprising broke out in China, prompting the European fleets in Asia to send warships to Taku. Kaiserin Augusta sent carried men from III Seebataillon to Taku. She put sixty men from her crew to assist with Admiral Edward Seymour's relief force to rescue the Europeans in Tientsin. During these operations, the ship's executive officer, KK Oltmann, was killed in battle. On 18 July, part of the landing party returned to the ship, but the rest remained ashore until mid-September.

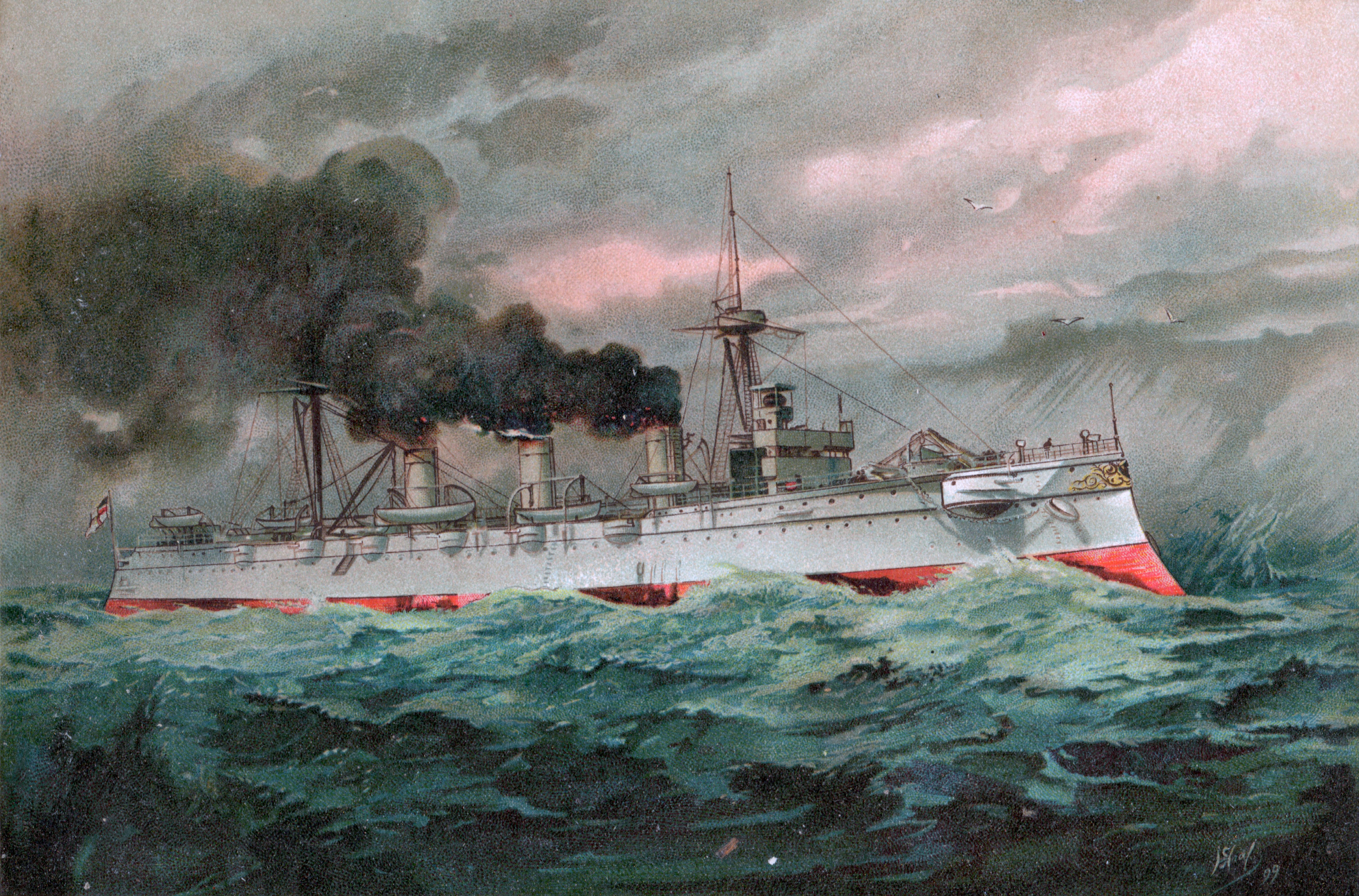
A 1902 lithograph of Kaiserin Augusta

Kaiserin Augusta served briefly as the squadron flagship, under VAdm Emil Felix von Bendemann, from 26 October to 18 November while the armored cruiser Fürst Bismarck was unavailable. She spent 1901 in Chinese and Japanese waters, with no events of note during the year. Fregattenkapitän (FK—Frigate Captain) Johannes Stein served as the ship's commander from January to November 1901, when he was replaced by FK Friedrich von Ingenohl, though he remained aboard only until March 1902. Ingenohl was relieved by KzS Carl Derzewski. On 6 March 1902, Kaiserin Augusta received orders to return to Germany, along with the torpedo boats S91 and S92. The vessels arrived back in Kiel on 7 June, and Kaiserin Augusta was decommissioned there on 16 June.

=== Later career ===
Obsolescent by the early 1900s, Kaiserin Augusta went into drydock for an extensive modernization that began in May 1903. During the refit, the ship's generators were replaced with more powerful units that more than doubled electrical output, at 124 kW at 110 V. Her bridge was significantly expanded, with a second deck and extended aft of the foremast. The three funnels were lengthened by 2 m (6 ft 7 in) and one searchlight was installed on each of the mast tops. The four swivel-mounted torpedo tubes were also removed during this period. After emerging from the modernization in late 1905, the ship was placed in reserve. She remained out of service until 1914, following the outbreak of World War I in July that year. Kaiserin Augusta was reactivated for use as a gunnery training ship, to replace the more modern armored cruiser SMS Blücher, which joined the High Seas Fleet. Her first commander during the war, from August to November, was KzS Ferdinand Bertram. Kaiserin Augusta was stationed in the Baltic Sea and was assigned to the coastal defense division of the Baltic in anticipation of a British attack through the Danish Straits.

To facilitate the training of gunners, the ship's armament was diversified several times throughout the war. The first change was completed on 30 October, when her 15 cm guns were removed. By the end of 1914, the threat of a direct British attack on the Baltic had receded, and so on 12 December, Kaiserin Augusta was removed from the coastal defense division. The ship largely remained in the relative safety of the western Baltic for the rest of the war. Further alterations were made to her armament as the war progressed. By the end of the conflict, she carried one 15 cm SK L/45 gun, four 10.5 cm SK L/45 guns, four 8.8 cm (3.46 in) SK L/45 guns, four 8.8 cm SK L/35 guns, five 8.8 cm SK L/30 guns, and one 8.8 cm SK L/30 gun in a U-boat mounting. She served in this capacity for the duration of the war, until she was decommissioned 14 December 1918. The ship was formally stricken from the naval register on 1 October 1919 and sold to Norddeutsche Tiefbaugesellschaft in Berlin, and broken up the next year in Kiel-Nordmole.
