= List of ship launches in 1906 =

The list of ship launches in 1906 includes a chronological list of ships launched in 1906.

	Ship	Class	Builder	Location	Country	Notes
13 January	Heroic	Ferry	Harland & Wolff	Belfast	United Kingdom	For Belfast Steamship Co.
17 January	Viola	Trawler	Cook, Welton & Gemmell	Beverley	United Kingdom	For Hellyer Steam Fishing Company
22 January	Torpilleur N° 341	38‑metre type Normand (1904 tranche) 1st class torpedo boat	Forges et Chantiers de la Méditerranée	Le Havre	France	For French Navy
23 January	B8	B-class submarine	Vickers Limited	Barrow-in-Furness	United Kingdom	
24 January	B9	B-class submarine	Vickers Limited	Barrow-in-Furness	United Kingdom	For:
27 January	Empress of Ireland	Ocean liner	Fairfield Shipbuilding and Engineering	Govan	United Kingdom	For Canadian Pacific Steamship Company
30 January	Roanne	Self‑propelled paddle‑wheel barge	Forges et Chantiers de la Méditerranée	Le Havre	France	For: Soc. des Messageries fluviales de France
January	Torpilleur N° 342	38‑metre type Normand (1904 tranche) 1st class torpedo boat	Forges et Chantiers de la Méditerranée	Le Havre	France	For French Navy
10 February	Dreadnought	Dreadnought	HM Dockyard, Portsmouth	Portsmouth	United Kingdom	
14 February	Rewa		William Denny & Brothers	Dumbarton	United Kingdom	For British-India Steam Navigation Company
24 February	Amazon	Passenger ship	Harland & Wolff	Belfast	United Kingdom	For Royal Mail Line.
27 January	Graphic	Ferry	Harland & Wolff	Belfast	United Kingdom	For Belfast Steamship Co.
27 February	N.E.R. No. 5	Hopper barge	Blyth Shipbuilding & Dry Docks Co. Ltd	Blyth	United Kingdom	For North Eastern Railway.
9 March	Ganges	Cargo liner	Charles Connell & Co	Glasgow	United Kingdom	
17 March	Dunkerque	Self‑propelled paddle‑wheel barge	Forges et Chantiers de la Méditerranée	Le Havre	France	For: Soc. des Messageries fluviales de France
22 March	Ortega	Cargo ship	Harland & Wolff	Belfast	United Kingdom	For Pacific Steam Navigation Company.
23 March	B10	B-class submarine	Vickers Limited	Barrow-in-Furness	United Kingdom	
23 March	Scharnhorst	Scharnhorst-class cruiser	Blohm + Voss	Hamburg	Germany	For Imperial German Navy
24 March	Torpilleur N° 343	38‑metre type Normand (1904 tranche) 1st class torpedo boat	Forges et Chantiers de la Méditerranée	Le Havre	France	For French Navy
9 April	Ikoma	Heavy cruiser	Kure Naval Arsenal	Kure, Hiroshima	Japan	
10 April	Earl Hereford	Trawler	Cook, Welton & Gemmell	Beverley	United Kingdom	For Earl Steam Fishing Co.
12 April	Matheran	Cargo ship	Harland & Wolff	Belfast	United Kingdom	For T. & J. Brocklebank.
20 April	Daffodil	Ferry	Robert Stephenson and Company	Newcastle upon Tyne	United Kingdom	For Wallasey Corporation
20 April	Torpilleur N° 344	38‑metre type Normand (1904 tranche) 1st class torpedo boat	Forges et Chantiers de la Méditerranée	Le Havre	France	For French Navy
21 April	Governor Cobb	Coastal passenger ship	Delaware River Iron Ship Building and Engine Works	Chester, Pennsylvania	United States	For Eastern Steamship Company
25 April	N.E.R. No. 6	Hopper barge	Blyth Shipbuilding & Dry Docks Co. Ltd	Blyth	United Kingdom	For North Eastern Railway.
5 May	Ioann Zlatoust	Evstafi-class battleship	Sevastopol Shipyard	Sevastopol	Russia	
7 May	Belle of Temagami	Steamboat	G. A. Pontbriand	Temagami	Canada	
11 May	Torpilleur N° 345	38‑metre type Normand (1904 tranche) 1st class torpedo boat	Forges et Chantiers de la Méditerranée	Le Havre	France	For French Navy
12 May	Prinz Ludwig	Ocean liner	AG Vulkan	Stettin	Germany	For Norddeutscher Lloyd
12 May	G132	S90-class torpedo boat	Germaniawerft	Kiel	Germany	For Imperial German Navy
21 May	N.E.R. No. 7	Hopper barge	Blyth Shipbuilding & Dry Docks Co. Ltd	Blyth	United Kingdom	For North Eastern Railway.
24 May	Oronsa	Cargo ship	Harland & Wolff	Belfast	United Kingdom	For Pacific Steam Navigation Company.
28 May	N.E.R. No. 8	Hopper barge	Blyth Shipbuilding & Dry Docks Co. Ltd	Blyth	United Kingdom	For North Eastern Railway.
28 May	Schlesien	Deutschland-class battleship	Schichau	Danzig	Germany	
30 May	Niki	Niki-class destroyer	AG Vulkan	Stettin	Germany	For Royal Hellenic Navy
6 June	Minotaur	Minotaur-class cruiser	Devonport Dockyard	Devonport	United Kingdom	
7 June	Lusitania	Ocean liner	John Brown & Co. Ltd	Clydebank	United Kingdom	For Cunard Line
7 June	Torpilleur N° 346	38‑metre type Normand (1904 tranche) 1st class torpedo boat	Forges et Chantiers de la Méditerranée	Le Havre	France	For French Navy
14 June	Gneisenau	Scharnhorst-class cruiser	AG Weser	Bremen	Germany	
23 June	Agamemnon	Lord Nelson-class battleship	William Beardmore and Company	Dalmuir	United Kingdom	
23 June	Ravelston	Cargo ship	William Gray & Co. Ltd.	West Hartlepool	United Kingdom	For Ravelston Shipping Co Ltd
23 June	Sheaf Field	Cargo ship	Blyth Shipbuilding & Dry Docks Co. Ltd	Blyth	United Kingdom	For Sheaf Steam Shipping Co. Ltd.
27 June	Esperanto	Schooner	Tarr and James Shipbuilders	Essex, Massachusetts	United States	
30 June	New Hampshire	Connecticut-class battleship	New York Shipbuilding Corporation	Camden, New Jersey	United States	The last American pre-dreadnought battleship
30 June	G133	S90-class torpedo boat	Germaniawerft	Kiel	Germany	For Imperial German Navy
5 July	Salamanca	Cargo ship	Harland & Wolff	Belfast	United Kingdom	For Hamburg America Line.
10 July	C1	C-class submarine	Vickers Limited	Barrow in Furness	United Kingdom	
18 July	Doxa	Niki-class destroyer	AG Vulkan	Stettin	Germany	For Royal Hellenic Navy
19 July	B.H.C. Rockbreaker No. 1	Dredger	Blyth Shipbuilding & Dry Docks Co. Ltd	Blyth	United Kingdom	For Blyth Harbour Commissioners.
23 July	G134	S90-class torpedo boat	Germaniawerft	Kiel	Germany	For Imperial German Navy
25 July	Sagamo		Canadian Ship Building Company	Toronto	Canada	For Muskosa Lakes Navigation and Hotel Company
4 August	U-1	Submarine	Germaniawerft	Kiel	Germany	
6 August	Émeraude	Émeraude-class submarine	Arsenal de Cherbourg	Cherbourg	France	For French Navy
6 August	Deux-Sèvres	Steamship	Forges et Chantiers de la Méditerranée	Le Havre	France	For Cie. de Navigation d'Orbigny-Faustin
25 August	G136	S90-class torpedo boat	Germaniawerft	Kiel	Germany	For Imperial German Navy
28 August	Nürnberg	Königsberg-class cruiser	Kaiserliche Werft Kiel	Kiel	Germany	
1 September	Cuttlefish	B-class submarine	Fore River Shipbuilding	Quincy, Massachusetts	United States	
4 September	Lord Nelson	Lord Nelson-class battleship	Palmers Shipbuilding and Iron Company	Jarrow	United Kingdom	Last pre-dreadnought battleship for the Royal Navy.
5 September	Volturno	Passenger steamer	Fairfield Shipbuilding and Engineering Company	Govan	United Kingdom	
6 September	Lady Furness	Cargo ship	Blyth Shipbuilding & Dry Docks Co. Ltd	Blyth	United Kingdom	For Alfred Christensen.
6 September	Rohilla	Cruise liner	Harland & Wolff	Belfast	United Kingdom	For British India Steam Navigation Company.
7 September	G135	S90-class torpedo boat	Germaniawerft	Kiel	Germany	For Imperial German Navy
10 September	Reserve	Lightship	AG Weser	Bremen	Germany	
20 September	Adriatic	Ocean liner	Harland and Wolff	Belfast	United Kingdom	For White Star Line
20 September	Agawa	Yacht	Ramage and Ferguson Ltd	Leith	United Kingdom	
20 September	Mauretania	Ocean liner	Swan, Hunter & Wigham Richardson	Wallsend	United Kingdom	For Cunard Line
20 September	Reina Regente	Protected cruiser	Arsenal de Ferrol	Ferrol	Spain	
20 September	Shannon	Minotaur-class cruiser	Chatham Dockyard	Chatham	United Kingdom	
22 September	Stuttgart	Königsberg-class cruiser	Kaiserliche Werft Danzig	Danzig	Germany	
22 September	S138	S138-class torpedo boat	Schichau-Werke	Elbing	Germany	For Imperial German Navy
22 September	Jacob van Heemskerck	Coastal defence ship	Rijkswerf	Amsterdam	Netherlands	For Royal Netherlands Navy
4 October	Octopus	C-class submarine	Fore River Shipbuilding	Quincy, Massachusetts	United States	
6 October	North Carolina	Tennessee-class cruiser	Newport News Shipbuilding	Newport News	United States	
18 October	Adele	Yacht	Hawthorn & Co	Leith, Scotland	United Kingdom	
18 October	Lanfranc	Ocean liner	Caledon Shipbuilding & Engineering Company	Dundee	United Kingdom	For Booth Line
18 October	Aburi	Cargo Ship	Harland & Wolff	Belfast	United Kingdom	For African Steamship Company.
30 October	TB 4	Cricket-class coastal destroyer	J. Samuel White	Cowes	United Kingdom	
October	Havana		William Cramp & Sons	Philadelphia	United States	For Ward Line
3 November	Evstafi	Evstafi-class battleship	Nikolayev Admiralty Shipyard,	Nikolayev	Russia	
4 November	Rurik	Armoured cruiser	Vickers Limited	Barrow-in-Furness	United Kingdom	For Imperial Russian Navy.
10 November	Andrei Pervozvanny	Evstafi-class battleship	Admiralty Shipyard,	Saint Petersburg	Russia	
12 November	S139	S138-class torpedo boat	Schichau-Werke	Elbing	Germany	For Imperial German Navy
15 November	Satsuma	Battleship	Yokosuka Naval Arsenal	Yokosuka, Kanagawa	Japan	
15 November	Sierra Leone	Cargo ship	Harland & Wolff	Belfast	United Kingdom	For Elder Dempster.
20 November	Opale	Émeraude-class submarine	Arsenal de Cherbourg	Cherbourg	France	For French Navy
1 December	Kronprinzessin Cecilie	Ocean Liner	AG Vulkan	Stettin	Germany	For Norddeutscher Lloyd
3 December	Antilles	Passenger-cargo ship	William Cramp & Sons	Philadelphia	United States	
7 December	Schleswig-Holstein	Deutschland-class battleship	Germaniawerft	Kiel	Germany	
10 November	Pallada	Bayan-class cruiser	Admiralty Shipyard	Saint Petersburg	Russia	
15 December	De Greve	Cargo ship	Blyth Shipbuilding & Dry Docks Co. Ltd	Blyth	United Kingdom	For N.V. Koninklijke Paketvaart Maatschappik.
15 December	Montana	Tennessee-class cruiser	Newport News Shipbuilding and Drydock Company	Newport News, Virginia	United States	
15 December	TB 5	Cricket-class coastal destroyer	J. Samuel White	Cowes	United Kingdom	
16 December	Abeille No. 7	Tug	Forges et Chantiers de la Méditerranée	Le Havre	France	For: Soc. de Remorquage "Les Abeilles"
17 December	Drague a Godets No.22	Dredger	Forges et Chantiers de la Méditerranée	Le Havre	France	For: Cie. Universelle du Canal Maritime de Suez
22 December	Re d'Italia	Ocean liner	Sir J Laing & Sons Ltd	Sunderland	United Kingdom	For Lloyd Sabaudo
Date unknown	Aurora	Tugboat	Dialogue & Company	Camden, New Jersey	United States	
Date unknown	B11	B-class submarine	Vickers Limited	Barrow-in-Furness	United Kingdom	
Date unknown	Boy Sam	Steam drifter	John Bowden	Porthleven	United Kingdom	For John E. Howe and others.
Date unknown	Champion	Steam drifter	Beeching Brothers Ltd.	Great Yarmouth	United Kingdom	For John McKenzie.
Date unknown	Comet Star	Steam drifter	Beeching Brothers Ltd.	Great Yarmouth	United Kingdom	For George Cowie.
Date unknown	Glenafton	Steam drifter	Beeching Brothers Ltd.	Great Yarmouth	United Kingdom	For Alexander Smith.
Date unknown	Goëland	Fishing vessel	Bonn & Mees	Rotterdam	Netherlands	For F. Courtois & F. Hovelaque
Date unknown	Hildalgo	Merchantman	Abdela & Mitchell Ltd.	Brimscombe	United Kingdom	For private owner.
Date unknown	Ibex	Steamship	Abdela & Mitchell Ltd.	Brimscombe	United Kingdom	For private owner.
Date unknown	Irene	Steam drifter	Beeching Brothers Ltd.	Great Yarmouth	United Kingdom	For Edward Baker.
Date unknown	Lysaght Puffin	Steamship	Abdela & Mitchell Ltd.	Brimscombe	United Kingdom	For John Lysaght Ltd.
Date unknown	Mariner	Tugboat		Camden, New Jersey	United States	
Date unknown	Nafkratousa	Thyella-class destroyer	Yarrow Shipbuilders	Poplar	United Kingdom	For Royal Hellenic Navy
Date unknown	Nike	Steam drifter	Beeching Brothers Ltd.	Great Yarmouth	United Kingdom	For private owner.
Date unknown	Orion	Steam drifter	Beeching Brothers Ltd.	Great Yarmouth	United Kingdom	For James Smith.
Date unknown	Premier	Steam drifter	Beeching Brothers Ltd.	Great Yarmouth	United Kingdom	For George Hall.
Date Unknown	San Juan	Merchantman	Abdela & Mitchell Ltd.	Brimscombe	United Kingdom	For private owner.
Date unknown	Thalatta	Thames barge	McLearon	Harwich	United Kingdom	
Date unknown	Theodore Roosevelt		Toledo Shipbuilding Company	Toledo, Ohio	United States	For Roosevelt Steamship Company
Date unknown	Picton	Steamship	Richardson, Duck & Co	Stockton, Great Britain	United Kingdom	
Date unknown	Providence	Lighter	Brown & Clapson	Barton-upon-Humber	United Kingdom	For John Charles Raper.
Date unknown	Strathearn	Cargo ship	Greenock & Grangemouth Dockyard Co. Ltd.		United Kingdom	For private owner.
Date unknown	Unnamed	Lighter	Brown & Clapson	Barton-upon-Humber	United Kingdom	For George F. Sleight.
