= SMS G134 =

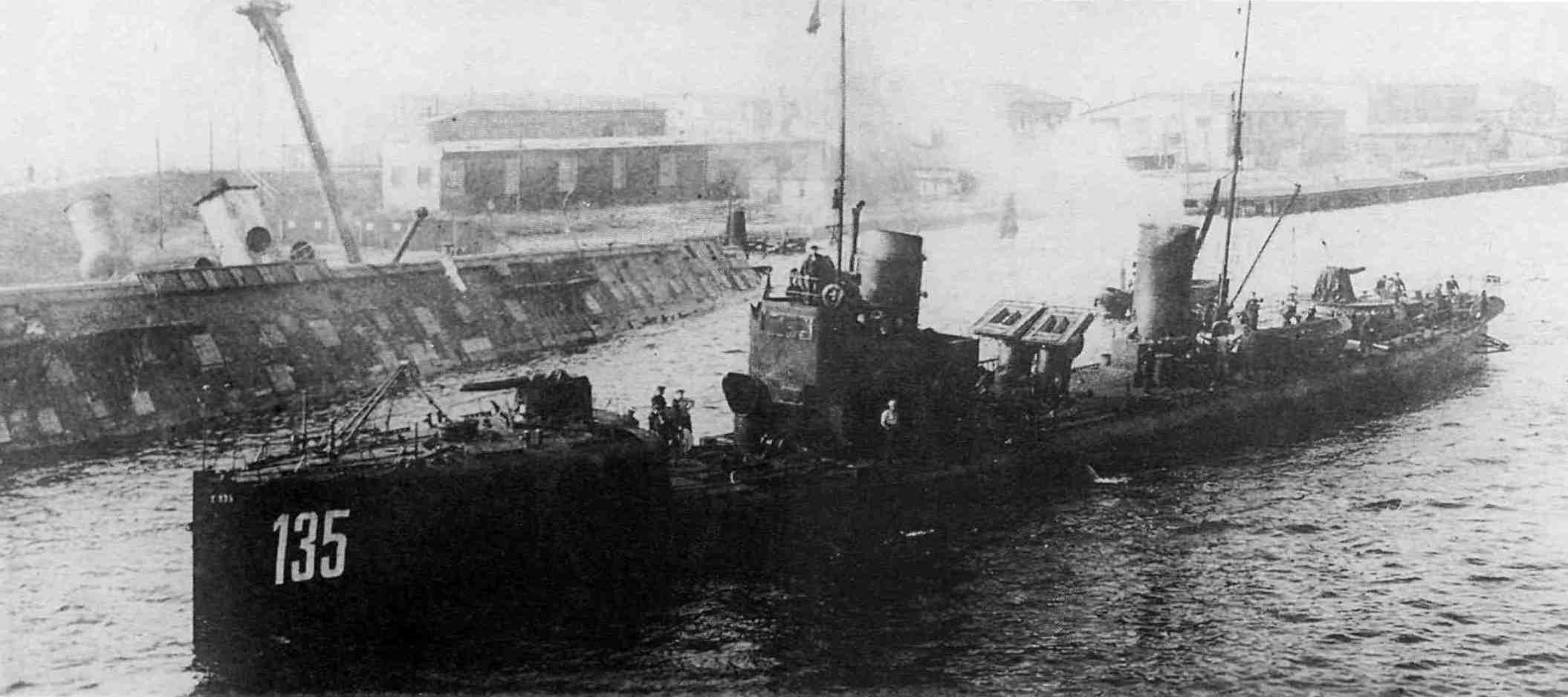
- Sister ship T135

History

German Empire
- Name: SMS G134
- Builder: Germaniawerft, Kiel
- Launched: 23 July 1906
- Commissioned: 6 March 1907
- Renamed: SMS T134: 27 September 1916
- Stricken: 9 November 1920
- Fate: Sold for scrap 13 May 1921

General characteristics
- Class & type: S90-class torpedo boat
- Displacement: 412 t (405 long tons)
- Length: 65.7 m (215 ft 7 in)
- Beam: 7.0 m (23 ft 0 in)
- Draft: 2.87 m (9 ft 5 in)
- Installed power: 7,000 PS (6,900 ihp; 5,100 kW)
- Propulsion: 3 × boilers; 2 × 3-cylinder triple expansion engines
- Speed: 28 kn (52 km/h; 32 mph)
- Range: 1,060 nmi (1,960 km; 1,220 mi) at 17 kn (31 km/h; 20 mph)
- Complement: 69
- Armament: 4 × 5.2 cm (2.0 in) L/55 guns; 3 × 450 mm torpedo tubes

SMS G134 (Note: "SMS" stands for German: Seiner Majestät Schiff, lit. 'His Majesty's Ship')) (Note: The "G" in G134 denoted the shipbuilder who constructed her.) was a S90-class torpedo boat of the Imperial German Navy. G134 was built by the Germaniawerft shipyard at Kiel as part of the 1905 construction programme, being launched on 23 July 1906 and entering service in March 1907.

The ship took part in the First World War, operating in the Baltic Sea in the first part of the war before transferring to training duties. She was renamed SMS T134 in 1916. T134 survived the war, and was sold for scrap in 1921.

== Design ==
The S90-class consisted of 48 torpedo-boats, built between 1898 and 1907 by Schichau and Germaniawerft for the Imperial German Navy. They were larger than previous German torpedo-boats, allowing them to work effectively with the High Seas Fleet in the North Sea, while also being large enough to act as flotilla leader when necessary, thus eliminating the need for separate larger division boats. As part of the fiscal year 1905 construction programme for the Imperial German Navy, six large torpedo boats (Große Torpedoboote) (G132–G137) were ordered from Germaniawerft, with five being powered by conventional reciprocating steam engines and the last, G137, powered by steam turbines.

G134 was 65.7 m (215 ft 7 in) long overall and 65.3 m (214 ft 3 in) at the waterline, with a beam of 7.0 m (23 ft 0 in) and a draught of 2.87 m (9 ft 5 in). Displacement was 412 tonnes (405 long tons) design and 544 tonnes (535 long tons) deep load. Three coal-fired water-tube boilers fed steam at a pressure of 17.5 standard atmospheres (257 psi) to two sets of three-cylinder triple expansion engines. The ship's machinery was rated at 7,000 PS (6,900 ihp; 5,100 kW) giving a design speed of 28 knots (32 mph; 52 km/h). 139 t of coal could be carried, giving a range of 1,060 nmi (1,220 mi; 1,960 km) at 17 kn (20 mph; 31 km/h) or 2,000 nmi (2,300 mi; 3,700 km) at 12 kn (14 mph; 22 km/h). The ship had two funnels and the distinct layout of the S90-class, with a torpedo tube placed in a well deck between the raised forecastle and the ship's bridge.

G134's initial armament was four 5.2 cm (2.0 in) SK L/55 guns and three 45 cm (17.7 in) torpedo tubes. Experience from the Russo-Japanese War of 1904–1905 indicated the need for heavier gun armament, and G133 was later rearmed with one 8.8 cm (3.5 in) SL L/35 gun and two 5.2 cm SK L/55 guns, with the torpedo armament remaining unchanged. The ship had a crew of two officers and 67 other ranks, although this increased to 84 when used as a flotilla leader.

== Construction and service ==
G134 was laid down at Germaniawerft's Kiel shipyard as Yard number 116. The ship was launched on 23 July 1906 and was completed on 6 March 1907. Cost of the 1905 torpedo boats varied between 1.171 and 1.195 Million marks.

In 1907, G134 was a member of the 5th half-flotilla, part of the 1st School Flotilla. In 1908, the 5th half-flotilla, including G134, had transferred to the active 1st Manoeuvre Flotilla. In 1909, G134 had transferred to the 9th half-flotilla, but remained part of the Manoeuvre Flotilla. In 1911, G134 was part of the 5th half-flotilla of the 3rd Torpedo boat Flotilla, remaining part of that unit through 1912, and into 1913, although the flotilla was now a reserve formation.

=== First World War ===
While the German Navy mobilised on 1 August 1914, owing to the imminent outbreak of the First World War, G134 was not a member of a torpedo-boat flotilla in the immediate aftermath of the mobilization. In September 1914, in a re-organisation of the German Baltic Fleet, G134 was one of five torpedo boats (Note: G132, G133, G134, G135 and G136.) transferred to the Baltic to replace the more modern V186 and V26, which transferred to the North Sea. G134 joined the 19th half-flotilla, tasked with patrol duties in the western Baltic. On 24 October, as part of a reorganisation of German patrol forces in the western Baltic, the 19th half-flotilla became part of the 4th Torpedo Boat Flotilla, while G134 was transferred to the 20th half-flotilla, based at Danzig and operating in the eastern Baltic. From 15 to 18 December 1914, G134 accompanied the 20th half-flotilla in a sortie by the armoured cruiser Prinz Adalbert and the light cruisers Amazone, Augsburg, Lübeck and Thetis into the Sea of Åland. On 17 December, G134 and the torpedo boat T97 investigated the Bogskär Lighthouse, which had been attacked in September that year, landing men using the ships' cutters to confirm that the lighthouse had not been repaired and was still out of use.

On 22 January 1915, G134 was one of eight torpedo boats (Note: G132, G133, G134, G135, G136, S129, T97 and S131.) that accompanied the cruisers Prinz Adalbert and Augsburg in a sweep north of Gotland, with Libau being shelled on the return journey. On 25 January 1915, the light cruiser Gazelle struck a mine near Cape Arkona. G134 and G132 towed Gazelle to Swinemünde on 26 January. On 28 March 1915, the cruiser Lübeck, together with G134 and G135, attacked Libau, with the intention of sinking a reported submarine. When the submarine was not found, the city was bombarded, with G134 attacking petroleum sheds, some steamers and oil tanks. After G135 spotted and destroyed a mine, plans to enter the port were abandoned. In April 1915, the Germany reorganised its Baltic torpedo-boat forces again, with G134 transferring to the 7th torpedo-boat half-flotilla, with duties of patrolling the Øresund. On 16 November 1915, G134 attempted to stop the British steamer Thelma in Lundåkra Bay. Thelma was one of 92 British ships trapped in Swedish and Russian Baltic ports at the start of the war, and was attempting to run past the German patrols of the Øresund and return to Britain. Thelma turned away and fled towards Swedish territorial waters, and G134 was forced to break off her pursuit, when the Swedish torpedo boat Pollux went to Thelma's assistance, with Pollux clearing for action and manning her guns. Sweden lodged a diplomatic protest about the incident, but this was rejected by Germany.

By May 1916, G134 had been transferred to training duties, being part of the School half-flotilla. On 27 September 1916, the ship was renamed T134, in order to free her number for new construction, in this case the torpedo boat S134. T134 remained on training duties at the end of the war, a member of the 1st school half-flotilla. After the end of the war, T134 was initially retained by the Weimar Republic's navy, the Reichsmarine, but was struck from the Naval lists on 9 November 1920 and sold for scrap on 13 May 1921.

== Bibliography ==
- Chesneau, Roger; Kolesnik, Eugene M., eds. (1979). Conway's All The World's Fighting Ships 1860–1905. London: Conway Maritime Press. ISBN 0-85177-133-5.
- Firle, Rudolph (1921). Der Krieg in der Ostsee: Erster Band: Von Kriegsbeginn bis Mitte März 1915. Der Krieg zur See: 1914–1918 (in German). Berlin: Verlag von E. S. Mittler und Sohn.
- Fock, Harald (1981). Schwarze Gesellen: Band 2: Zerstörer bis 1914 (in German). Herford, Germany: Koelers Verlagsgesellschaft mBH. ISBN 3-7822-0206-6.
- Fock, Harald (1989). Z-Vor! Internationale Entwicklung und Kriegseinsätze von Zerstörern und Torpedobooten 1914 bis 1939 (in German). Herford, Germany: Koehlers Verlagsgesellschaft mBH. ISBN 3-7822-0207-4.
- Gardiner, Robert; Gray, Randal, eds. (1985). Conway's All The World's Fighting Ships 1906–1921. London: Conway Maritime Press. ISBN 0-85177-245-5.
- Gröner, Erich; Jung, Dieter; Maass, Martin (1983). Die deutschen Kriegsschiffe 1815–1945: Band 2: Torpedoboote, Zerstörer, Schnellboote, Minensuchboote, Minenräumboote (in German). Koblenz: Bernard & Graef Verlag. ISBN 3-7637-4801-6.
- Halpern, Paul G. (1994). A Naval History of World War I. London: UCL Press. ISBN 1-85728-498-4.
- Hildebrand, Hans H.; Röhr, Albert; Steinmetz, Hans-Otto (1980). Die Deutschen Kriegsschiffe: Biographien — ein Spiegel der Marinegeschichte von 1815 bis zur Gegenwart: Band 2 (in German). Herford, Germany: Koelers Verlagsgesellschaft mBH. ISBN 3-7822-0210-4.
- Monograph No. 25: The Baltic 1914 (PDF). Naval Staff Monographs (Historical). Vol. VII. The Naval Staff, Training and Staff Duties Division. 1922. pp. 67–103.
- Rollmann, Heinrich (1929). Der Krieg in der Ostsee: Zwieter Band: Das Kriegjahr 1915. Der Krieg zur See: 1914–1918 (in German). Berlin: Verlag von E.S. Mittler & Sohn.
- Stoelzel, Albert (1930). Ehrenrangliste der Kaiserlich Deutschen Marine 1914–1918 (in German). Berlin: Thormann & Goetsch.
