= SMS G133 =

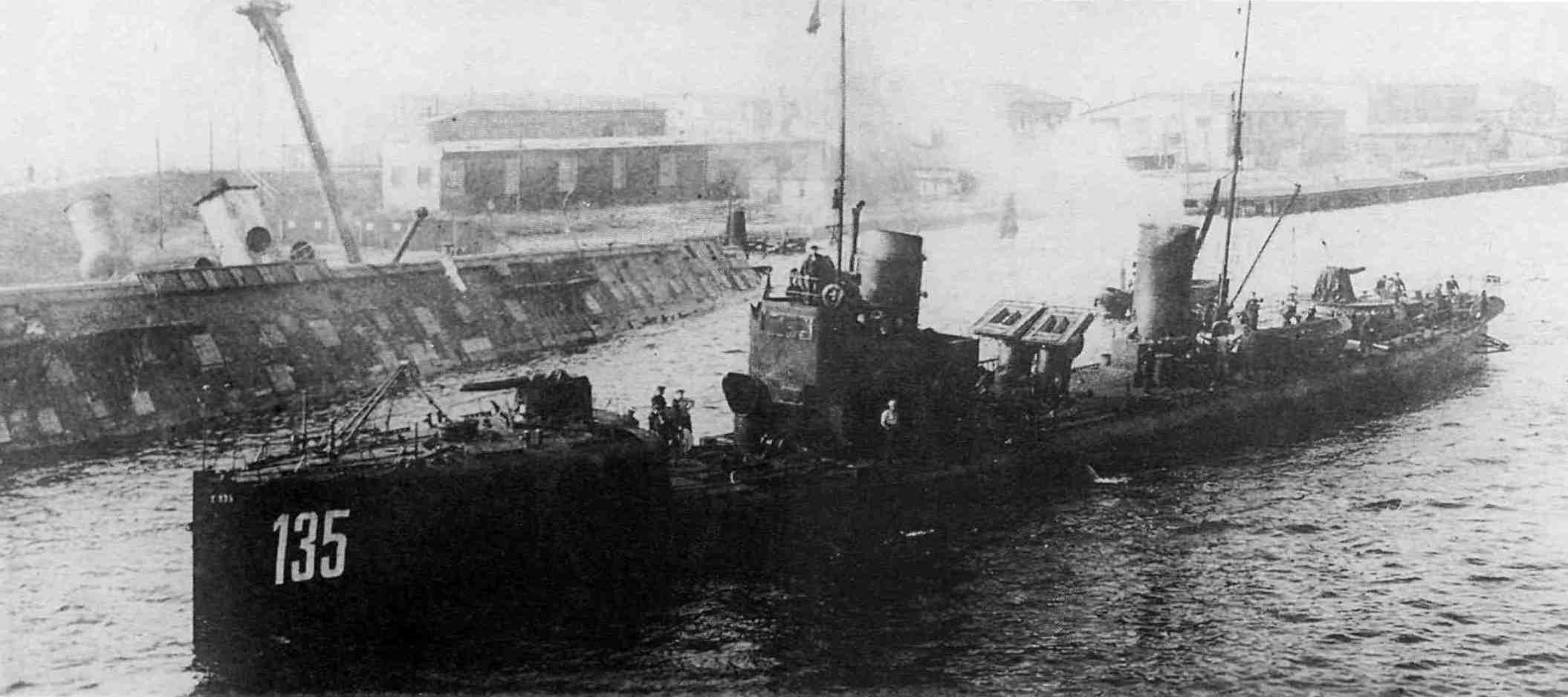
- Sister ship T135

History

German Empire
- Name: SMS G133
- Builder: Germaniawerft, Kiel
- Launched: 30 June 1906
- Commissioned: 10 December 1906
- Renamed: SMS T133: 27 September 1916
- Stricken: 22 March 1921
- Fate: Sold for scrap 28 May 1921

General characteristics
- Class & type: S90-class torpedo boat
- Displacement: 412 t (405 long tons)
- Length: 65.7 m (215 ft 7 in)
- Beam: 7.0 m (23 ft 0 in)
- Draft: 2.87 m (9 ft 5 in)
- Installed power: 7,000 PS (6,900 ihp; 5,100 kW)
- Propulsion: 3 × boilers; 2 × 3-cylinder triple expansion engines
- Speed: 28 kn (52 km/h; 32 mph)
- Range: 1,060 nmi (1,960 km; 1,220 mi) at 17 kn (31 km/h; 20 mph)
- Complement: 69
- Armament: 4 × 5.2 cm (2.0 in) L/55 guns; 3 × 450 mm torpedo tubes

SMS G133 (Note: "SMS" stands for German: Seiner Majestät Schiff, lit. 'His Majesty's Ship')) (Note: The "G" in G133 denoted the shipbuilder who constructed her.) was a S90-class torpedo boat of the Imperial German Navy. G133 was built by the Germaniawerft shipyard at Kiel in 1905–1906, being launched on 30 June 1906 and entering service at the end of that year.

The ship took part in the First World War, operating in the Baltic Sea. She was renamed SMS T133 in 1916. T133 survived the war, and was sold for scrap in 1921.

== Design ==
The S90-class consisted of 48 torpedo-boats, built between 1898 and 1907 by Schichau and Germaniawerft for the Imperial German Navy. They were larger than previous German torpedo-boats, allowing them to work effectively with the High Seas Fleet in the North Sea, while also being large enough to act as flotilla leader when necessary, thus eliminating the need for separate larger division boats. As part of the fiscal year 1905 construction programme for the Imperial German Navy, six large torpedo boats (Große Torpedoboote) (G132–G137) were ordered from Germaniawerft, with five being powered by conventional reciprocating steam engines and the last, G137, powered by steam turbines.

G133 was 65.7 m (215 ft 7 in) long overall and 65.3 m (214 ft 3 in) at the waterline, with a beam of 7.0 m (23 ft 0 in) and a draught of 2.87 m (9 ft 5 in). Displacement was 412 tonnes (405 long tons) design and 544 tonnes (535 long tons) deep load. Three coal-fired water-tube boilers fed steam at a pressure of 17.5 standard atmospheres (257 psi) to two sets of three-cylinder triple expansion engines. The ship's machinery was rated at 7,000 PS (6,900 ihp; 5,100 kW) giving a design speed of 28 knots (32 mph; 52 km/h). 139 t of coal could be carried, giving a range of 1,060 nmi (1,220 mi; 1,960 km) at 17 kn (20 mph; 31 km/h) or 2,000 nmi (2,300 mi; 3,700 km) at 12 kn (14 mph; 22 km/h). The ship had two funnels and the distinct layout of the S90-class, with a torpedo tube placed in a well deck between the raised forecastle and the ship's bridge.

G133's initial armament was four 5.2 cm (2.0 in) SK L/55 guns and three 45 cm (17.7 in) torpedo tubes. Experience from the Russo-Japanese War of 1904–1905 indicated the need for heavier gun armament, and G133 was later rearmed with one 8.8 cm (3.5 in) SL L/35 gun and two 5.2 cm SK L/55 guns, with the torpedo armament remaining unchanged. The ship had a crew of two officers and 67 other ranks, although this increased to 84 when used as a flotilla leader.

== Construction and service ==
G133 was laid down at Germaniawerft's Kiel shipyard as Yard number 115. The ship was launched on 30 June 1906 and was completed on 10 December 1906. Cost of the 1905 torpedo boats varied between 1.171 and 1.195 Million marks.

In 1907, G133 was a member of the 5th half-flotilla, part of the 1st School Flotilla. In 1908, the 5th half-flotilla, including G133, had transferred to the active 1st Manoeuvre Flotilla. In 1909, G133 had transferred to the 9th half-flotilla, but remained part of the Manoeuvre Flotilla. In 1911, G133 was listed as part of the 5th half-flotilla of the 3rd Torpedo boat Flotilla, remaining part of that unit through 1912, and into 1913, although the flotilla was now a reserve formation.

=== First World War ===
In September 1914, in a re-organisation of the German Baltic Fleet, G133 was one of five torpedo boats (Note: G133, G132, G134, G135 and G136.) transferred to the Baltic to replace the more modern V186 and V26, which transferred to the North Sea. G132, G133, G134 and G136 were used to form the new 20th half-flotilla, which was based in Danzig, Prussia (now Gdańsk, Poland) for operations in the Eastern Baltic. From 24 to 30 October 1914, the 20th half-flotilla took part in a sortie of cruisers into the Gulf of Finland, with the intention of luring the Russian Baltic Fleet out in pursuit where it could be attacked by German submarines. On 17 November 1914, G133 led G132 and G136 of the 20th half-flotilla, supported by the cruisers Lübeck and Amazone carried out an attack on the port of Libau (now Liepāja, Latvia). Four blockships were sunk at the entrances to the harbour, and the port was shelled.

On 22 January 1915, G133 was one of eight torpedo boats (Note: G132, G133, G134, G135, G136, S129, T97 and S131.) that accompanied the cruisers Prinz Adalbert and Augsburg in a sweep north of Gotland, with Libau being shelled on the return journey. G133 was transferred to the 7th half-flotilla of the 4th Torpedo Boat Flotilla, for patrols in the Øresund during 1915. On 27 September 1916, the ship was renamed T133, in order to free her number for new construction, in this case the V125-class torpedo boat S133. T133 remained part of the 7th half-flotilla at the end of the war in November 1918.

=== Disposal ===
After the end of the war, T133 was initially retained by the Weimar Republic's navy, the Reichsmarine, but was struck from the Naval lists on 22 March 1921 and sold for scrap in 28 May that year.

== Bibliography ==
- Chesneau, Roger; Kolesnik, Eugene M., eds. (1979). Conway's All The World's Fighting Ships 1860–1905. London: Conway Maritime Press. ISBN 0-85177-133-5.
- Firle, Rudolph (1921). Der Krieg in der Ostsee: Erster Band: Von Kriegsbeginn bis Mitte März 1915. Der Krieg zur See: 1914–1918 (in German). Berlin: Verlag von E. S. Mittler und Sohn.
- Fock, Harald (1981). Schwarze Gesellen: Band 2: Zerstörer bis 1914 (in German). Herford, Germany: Koelers Verlagsgesellschaft mBH. ISBN 3-7822-0206-6.
- Fock, Harald (1989). Z-Vor! Internationale Entwicklung und Kriegseinsätze von Zerstörern und Torpedobooten 1914 bis 1939 (in German). Herford, Germany: Koehlers Verlagsgesellschaft mBH. ISBN 3-7822-0207-4.
- Gardiner, Robert; Gray, Randal, eds. (1985). Conway's All The World's Fighting Ships 1906–1921. London: Conway Maritime Press. ISBN 0-85177-245-5.
- Gröner, Erich; Jung, Dieter; Maass, Martin (1983). Die deutschen Kriegsschiffe 1815–1945: Band 2: Torpedoboote, Zerstörer, Schnellboote, Minensuchboote, Minenräumboote (in German). Koblenz: Bernard & Graef Verlag. ISBN 3-7637-4801-6.
- Monograph No. 25: The Baltic 1914 (PDF). Naval Staff Monographs (Historical). Vol. VII. The Naval Staff, Training and Staff Duties Division. 1922. pp. 67–103.
- Rollmann, Heinrich (1929). Der Krieg in der Ostsee: Zwieter Band: Das Kriegjahr 1915. Der Krieg zur See: 1914–1918 (in German). Berlin: Verlag von E.S. Mittler & Sohn.
