= SMS G136 =

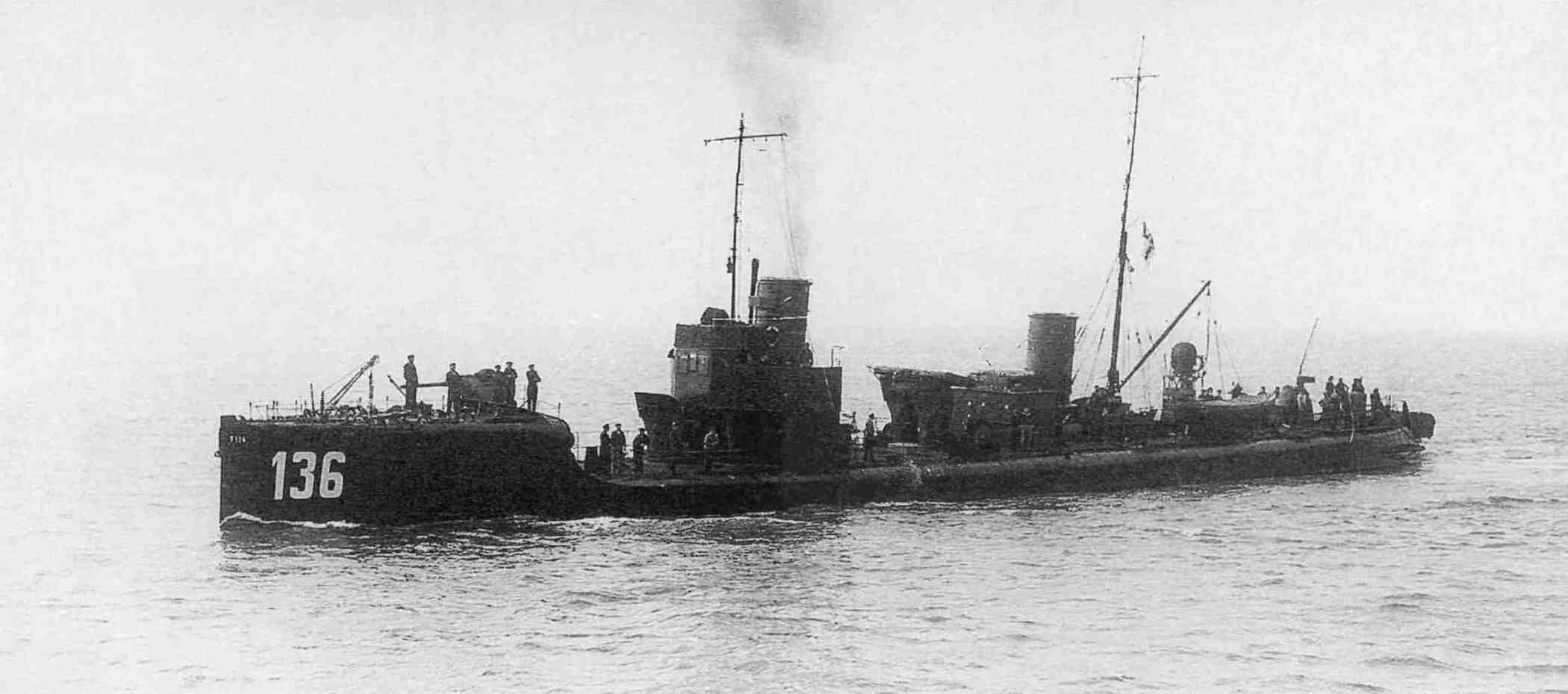
- T136

History

German Empire
- Name: SMS G135
- Builder: Germaniawerft, Kiel
- Launched: 25 August 1906
- Commissioned: 16 March 1907
- Renamed: SMS T136: 27 September 1916
- Fate: Sold for scrap 1921

General characteristics
- Class & type: S90-class torpedo boat
- Displacement: 412 t (405 long tons)
- Length: 65.7 m (215 ft 7 in)
- Beam: 7.0 m (23 ft 0 in)
- Draft: 2.87 m (9 ft 5 in)
- Installed power: 7,000 PS (6,900 ihp; 5,100 kW)
- Propulsion: 3 × boilers; 2 × 3-cylinder triple expansion engines
- Speed: 28 kn (52 km/h; 32 mph)
- Range: 1,060 nmi (1,960 km; 1,220 mi) at 17 kn (31 km/h; 20 mph)
- Complement: 69
- Armament: 1 x 8.8 cm (3.5 in) SL L/35 gun; 2 × 5.2 cm (2.0 in) L/55 guns; 3 × 450 mm torpedo tubes

SMS G136 (Note: "SMS" stands for German: Seiner Majestät Schiff, lit. 'His Majesty's Ship') (Note: The "G" in G136 denoted the shipbuilder who constructed her.) was a S90-class torpedo boat of the Imperial German Navy. G135 was built by the Germaniawerft shipyard at Kiel in 1905–1907, being launched on 25 August 1906 and entering service in March 1907.

The ship took part in the First World War, operating in the Baltic Sea in the early years of the war. Later in the war, she was used for minesweeping and escort duties. G136 was renamed SMS T136 in 1916. T136 survived the war, and was sold for scrap in 1921.

== Design and construction ==
The S90-class consisted of 48 torpedo-boats, built between 1898 and 1907 by Schichau and Germaniawerft for the Imperial German Navy. They were larger than previous German torpedo-boats, allowing them to work effectively with the High Seas Fleet in the North Sea, while also being large enough to act as flotilla leader when necessary, thus eliminating the need for separate larger division boats. As part of the fiscal year 1905 construction programme for the Imperial German Navy, six large torpedo boats (Große Torpedoboote) (G132–G137) were ordered from Germaniawerft, with five being powered by conventional reciprocating steam engines and the last, G137, powered by steam turbines.

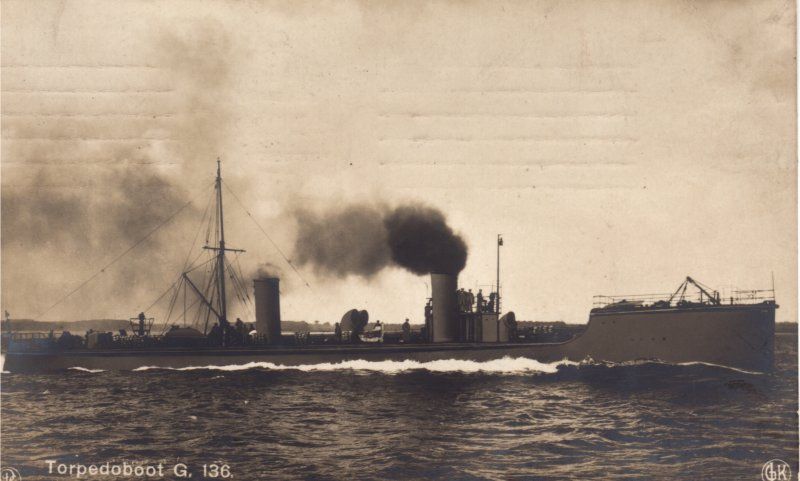
G136

G135 was 65.7 m (215 ft 7 in) long overall and 65.3 m (214 ft 3 in) at the waterline, with a beam of 7.0 m (23 ft 0 in) and a draught of 2.87 m (9 ft 5 in). The ship had a design displacement of 412 tonnes (405 long tons) which increased to 544 tonnes (535 long tons) at deep load. Three coal-fired water-tube boilers fed steam at a pressure of 17.5 standard atmospheres (257 psi) to two sets of three-cylinder triple expansion engines. The ship's machinery was rated at 7,000 PS (6,900 ihp; 5,100 kW) giving a design speed of 28 knots (32 mph; 52 km/h). The ship had two funnels and the distinct layout of the S90-class, with a torpedo tube placed in a well deck between the raised forecastle and the ship's bridge. 139 t of coal could be carried, giving a range of 1,060 nmi (1,220 mi; 1,960 km) at 17 kn (20 mph; 31 km/h) or 2,000 nmi (2,300 mi; 3,700 km) at 12 kn (14 mph; 22 km/h).

G136 was fitted with a gun armament of a single 8.8 cm (3.5 in) SL L/35 gun and two 5.2 cm SK L/55 guns. These were later replaced by two 8.8 cm SK L/45 naval guns. The ship was fitted with three 45 cm (17.7 in) torpedo tubes. The ship had a crew of two officers and 67 other ranks, although this increased to 84 when used as a flotilla leader.

G136 was laid down at Germaniawerft's Kiel shipyard as Yard number 118. The ship was launched on 25 August 1906 and was completed on 16 March 1907. Cost of the 1905 torpedo boats varied between 1.171 and 1.195 Million marks.

== Service ==
On commissioning, G136 joined the 5th torpedo-boat half-flotilla, part of the 1st School Flotilla. In 1908, the 5th half-flotilla, including G136, had transferred to the active 1st Manoeuvre Flotilla. In 1909, G136 had transferred to the 9th half-flotilla, which remained part of the Manoeuvre Flotilla. In 1911, G136 was part of the 5th half-flotilla of the 3rd Torpedo boat Flotilla, remaining part of that unit through 1912, and into 1913, although the flotilla was now a reserve formation.

=== First World War ===
While the German Navy mobilised on 1 August 1914, owing to the imminent outbreak of the First World War, G136 was not a member of a torpedo-boat flotilla in the immediate aftermath of the mobilization. In September 1914, in a re-organisation of the German Baltic Fleet, G136 was one of five torpedo boats (Note: G132, G133, G134, G135 and G136.) transferred to the Baltic to replace the more modern V186 and V26, which transferred to the North Sea. G132, G133, G135 and G136 were used to form the new 20th half-flotilla, which was based in Danzig, Prussia (now Gdańsk, Poland) for operations in the Eastern Baltic. From 24 to 30 October 1914, the 20th half-flotilla took part in a sortie of cruisers into the Gulf of Finland, with the intention of luring the Russian Baltic Fleet out in pursuit where it could be attacked by German submarines. On 17 November, G136, G132 and G133, together with the cruisers Lübeck and Amazone carried out an attack on Libau (now Liepāja, Latvia), shelling the port, with four blockships being sank at the entrance to the port.

On 22 January 1915, G136 was one of eight torpedo boats (Note: G132, G133, G134, G135, G136, S129, T97 and S131.) that accompanied the cruisers Prinz Adalbert and Augsburg in a sweep north of Gotland, with Libau being shelled on the return journey. In April 1915, G136 was transferred to the 7th half-flotilla, with duties of patrolling the Øresund. On 9 September 1915, G136 sighted a submarine, possibly the British E18, south of Falsterbo, which dived away before G136 could take effective countermeasures, with the cruiser Amazone having a similar encounter shortly afterwards. (Note: The British submarines E18 and E19 both successfully passed through the Øresund to the Baltic at the time, with E18's passage being described as "particularly harrowing".)

The ship was later employed as a flagship for minesweeper flotillas, and in May 1916 was attached to the 2nd Minesweeping division of the 2nd Minesweeping Flotilla, operating in the Baltic. G136 was renamed T136 on 27 September 1916, in order to free her number for new construction, in this case the 1916 Mobilisation type torpedo boat S136. At the end of 1917, T136 was part of the 3rd half flotilla of the 2nd Minesweeping Flotilla. In early 1918, owing to the need to escort German U-boats through minefields in the German Bight, the coastal patrol and minesweeping forces of the German forces were reorganised to form large escort flotillas. T136 joined one of these escort flotillas, being leader of the 3rd escort half-flotilla of the 1st Escort Flotilla in April 1918.

After the end of the war, T136 was initially retained by the Weimar Republic's navy, the Reichsmarine, but was struck from the Naval lists on 21 July 1921. She was sold for scrap on 20 August that year and broken up at Wilhelmshaven.

== Bibliography ==
- Chesneau, Roger; Kolesnik, Eugene M., eds. (1979). Conway's All The World's Fighting Ships 1860–1905. London: Conway Maritime Press. ISBN 0-85177-133-5.
- Firle, Rudolph (1921). Der Krieg in der Ostsee: Erster Band: Von Kriegsbeginn bis Mitte März 1915. Der Krieg zur See: 1914–1918 (in German). Berlin: Verlag von E. S. Mittler und Sohn.
- Fock, Harald (1981). Schwarze Gesellen: Band 2: Zerstörer bis 1914 (in German). Herford, Germany: Koelers Verlagsgesellschaft mBH. ISBN 3-7822-0206-6.
- Fock, Harald (1989). Z-Vor! Internationale Entwicklung und Kriegseinsätze von Zerstörern und Torpedobooten 1914 bis 1939 (in German). Herford, Germany: Koehlers Verlagsgesellschaft mBH. ISBN 3-7822-0207-4.
- Gardiner, Robert; Gray, Randal, eds. (1985). Conway's All The World's Fighting Ships 1906–1921. London: Conway Maritime Press. ISBN 0-85177-245-5.
- Gladisch, Walter, ed. (1965). Der Krieg in der Nordsee: Band 7: Vom Sommer 1917 bis zum Kriegsende 1918. Frankfurt: Verlag E.S. Mittler & Sohn.
- Gröner, Erich; Jung, Dieter; Maass, Martin (1983). Die deutschen Kriegsschiffe 1815–1945: Band 2: Torpedoboote, Zerstörer, Schnellboote, Minensuchboote, Minenräumboote (in German). Koblenz: Bernard & Graef Verlag. ISBN 3-7637-4801-6.
- Halpern, Paul G. (1994). A Naval History of World War I. London: UCL Press. ISBN 1-85728-498-4.
- Monograph No. 25: The Baltic 1914 (PDF). Naval Staff Monographs (Historical). Vol. VII. The Naval Staff, Training and Staff Duties Division. 1922. pp. 67–103.
- Rollmann, Heinrich (1929). Der Krieg in der Ostsee: Zwieter Band: Das Kriegjahr 1915. Der Krieg zur See: 1914–1918 (in German). Berlin: Verlag von E.S. Mittler & Sohn.
- Stoelzel, Albert (1930). Ehrenrangliste der Kaiserlich Deutschen Marine 1914–1918 (in German). Berlin: Thormann & Goetsch.
