= SMS G135 =

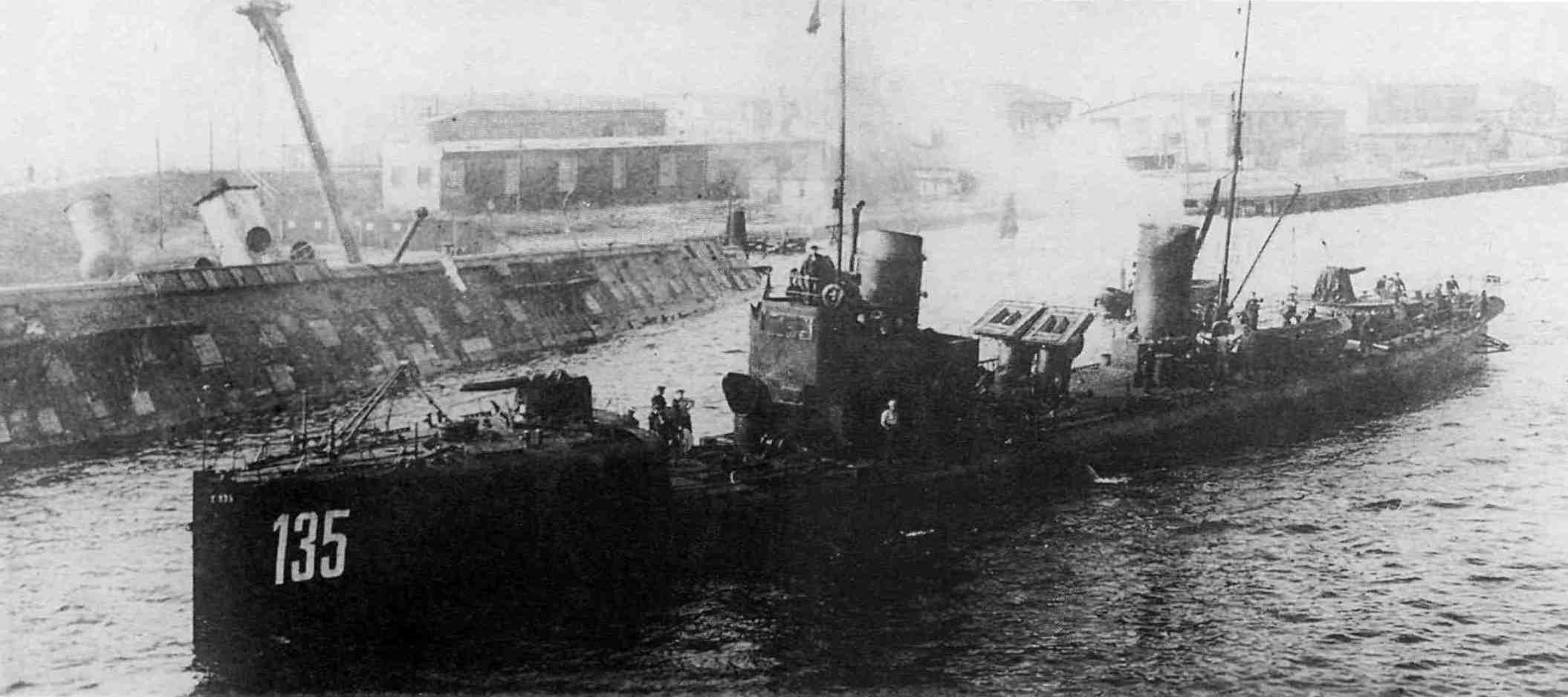
- T135

History

German Empire
- Name: SMS G135
- Builder: Germaniawerft, Kiel
- Launched: 7 September 1906
- Commissioned: 24 January 1907
- Renamed: SMS T135: 27 September 1916
- Fate: Sold for scrap 1921

General characteristics
- Class & type: S90-class torpedo boat
- Displacement: 412 t (405 long tons)
- Length: 65.7 m (215 ft 7 in)
- Beam: 7.0 m (23 ft 0 in)
- Draft: 2.87 m (9 ft 5 in)
- Installed power: 7,000 PS (6,900 ihp; 5,100 kW)
- Propulsion: 3 × boilers; 2 × 3-cylinder triple expansion engines
- Speed: 28 kn (52 km/h; 32 mph)
- Range: 1,060 nmi (1,960 km; 1,220 mi) at 17 kn (31 km/h; 20 mph)
- Complement: 69
- Armament: 1 x 8.8 cm (3.5 in) SL L/35 gun; 2 × 5.2 cm (2.0 in) L/55 guns; 3 × 450 mm torpedo tubes

SMS G135 (Note: "SMS" stands for German: Seiner Majestät Schiff, lit. 'His Majesty's Ship') (Note: The "G" in G135 denoted the shipbuilder who constructed her.) was a S90-class torpedo boat of the Imperial German Navy. G135 was built by the Germaniawerft shipyard at Kiel in 1905–1907, being launched on 7 September 1906 and entering service in January 1907.

The ship took part in the First World War, operating in the Baltic Sea in the early years of the war and taking part in the Battle of Åland Islands in July 1915. Later in the war, she was used for coastal defence and escort duties. G135 was renamed SMS T135 in 1916. T135 survived the war, and was sold for scrap in 1921.

== Design and construction ==
The S90-class consisted of 48 torpedo-boats, built between 1898 and 1907 by Schichau and Germaniawerft for the Imperial German Navy. They were larger than previous German torpedo-boats, allowing them to work effectively with the High Seas Fleet in the North Sea, while also being large enough to act as flotilla leader when necessary, thus eliminating the need for separate larger division boats. As part of the fiscal year 1905 construction programme for the Imperial German Navy, six large torpedo boats (Große Torpedoboote) (G132–G137) were ordered from Germaniawerft, with five being powered by conventional reciprocating steam engines and the last, G137, powered by steam turbines.

G135 was 65.7 m (215 ft 7 in) long overall and 65.3 m (214 ft 3 in) at the waterline, with a beam of 7.0 m (23 ft 0 in) and a draught of 2.87 m (9 ft 5 in). The ship had a design displacement of 412 tonnes (405 long tons) which increased to 544 tonnes (535 long tons) at deep load. Three coal-fired water-tube boilers fed steam at a pressure of 17.5 standard atmospheres (257 psi) to two sets of three-cylinder triple expansion engines. The ship's machinery was rated at 7,000 PS (6,900 ihp; 5,100 kW) giving a design speed of 28 knots (32 mph; 52 km/h). (Note: The German Official history claimed that G135's effective speed was barely 20 kn (23 mph; 37 km/h) in the Battle of Åland Islands in July 1915.) The ship had two funnels and the distinct layout of the S90-class, with a torpedo tube placed in a well deck between the raised forecastle and the ship's bridge. 139 t of coal could be carried, giving a range of 1,060 nmi (1,220 mi; 1,960 km) at 17 kn (20 mph; 31 km/h) or 2,000 nmi (2,300 mi; 3,700 km) at 12 kn (14 mph; 22 km/h).

G135 was fitted with a heavier gun armament than the earlier 1905 torpedo boats, with a single 8.8 cm (3.5 in) SL L/35 gun and two 5.2 cm SK L/55 guns. The ship was fitted with three 45 cm (17.7 in) torpedo tubes. The ship had a crew of two officers and 67 other ranks, although this increased to 84 when used as a flotilla leader.

G135 was laid down at Germaniawerft's Kiel shipyard as Yard number 117. The ship was launched on 7 September 1906 and was completed on 24 January 1907. Cost of the 1905 torpedo boats varied between 1.171 and 1.195 Million marks.

== Service ==
On commissioning, G135 joined the 5th torpedo-boat half-flotilla, part of the 1st School Flotilla, acting as leader of the half-flotilla. In 1908, the 5th half-flotilla, including G135, had transferred to the active 1st Manoeuvre Flotilla. In 1909, G135 had transferred to the 9th half-flotilla, but remained part of the Manoeuvre Flotilla. G135 continued to serve as leader of the half-flotilla. In 1911, G135 was listed as leader of the 5th half-flotilla of the 3rd Torpedo boat Flotilla, remaining part of that unit through 1912, and into 1913, although the flotilla was now a reserve formation.

=== First World War ===
In September 1914, in a re-organisation of the German Baltic Fleet, G135 was one of five torpedo boats (Note: G132, G133, G134, G135 and G136.) transferred to the Baltic to replace the more modern V186 and V26, which transferred to the North Sea. G132, G133, G135 and G136 were used to form the new 20th half-flotilla, which was based in Danzig, Prussia (now Gdańsk, Poland) for operations in the Eastern Baltic. From 24 to 30 October 1914, the 20th half-flotilla took part in a sortie of cruisers into the Gulf of Finland, with the intention of luring the Russian Baltic Fleet out in pursuit where it could be attacked by German submarines.

On 22 January 1915, G135 was one of nine torpedo boats (Note: G132, G133, G134, G135, G136, S129, T97 and S131.) that accompanied the cruisers Prinz Adalbert and Augsburg in a sweep north of Gotland, with Libau (now Liepāja, Latvia), being shelled on the return journey. On 28 March 1915, the cruiser Lübeck, together with G135 and G134, bombarded Libau, with G135 attacking a steel works, some steamers and oil tanks. After G135 spotted and destroyed a mine, plans to enter the port were abandoned. In April 1915, the Baltic fleet's torpedo boat forces were strengthened and reorganised, with G135 becoming leader of the newly established 10th Torpedo-boat Flotilla. From 12 to 15 May, G135 and the 20th half-flotilla accompanied the cruisers Prinz Adalbert, Prinz Heinrich, Roon, Augsburg and Thetis on a minelaying sortie in the Gulf of Riga. From 3 June, the Germans launched a major minelaying operation, in which their ships would pass through the Irbe Strait and mine the south entrance to the Moon Sound. The force encountered heavy Russian opposition, and on 4 June, (Note: 3 June according to Rollman) G135 spotted the Russian submarine Okun as the submarine was attempting an attack on Thetis. G135 rammed Okun as the submarine fired torpedoes at Thetis. The torpedoes missed, and Okun escaped with a bent periscope. The operation was abandoned, but while returning to base, the seaplane carrier Glyndwr was mined and badly damaged, while the British submarine E9 sank the collier Dora Hugo Stinnes and badly damaged the torpedo boat S148.

On 20 June 1915, G135 escorted the minelayer Albatross for another minelaying operation in the Baltic, with Albatross laying 200 mines off Bogskär, and on 24–25 June, along with S139, escorted Thetis on a reconnaissance sortie into the North Baltic. On 26 June, G135 and Thetis escorted Albatross as the minelayer laid another 350 mines. On 1 July 1915, Albatross was tasked with laying mines to the northeast and northwest of Bogskär. On the morning of 2 July, with the minefields laid, G135, along with S141, S142 and Augsburg, was escorting Albatross towards Rixhöft when a larger Russian force was sighted. In the resultant Battle of Åland Islands, Kommodore Johannes von Karpf aboard Augsburg, ordered the slower Albatross to make for neutral Swedish waters while the rest of the force escaped to the south. The Russians concentrated on Albatross, which was badly damaged and ran aground in Swedish waters near Östergarn, later being interned by Sweden. Augsburg and the three torpedo boats escaped.

By May 1916, G135 was assigned to the Coastal Defence flotilla guarding the Weser and Jade estuaries, leading a group of five Vorpostenboote (outpost or patrol boats). On 27 September 1916, the ship was renamed T135, in order to free her number for new construction, in this case the torpedo boat S135. In early 1918, owing to the need to escort German U-boats through minefields in the German Bight, the coastal patrol and minesweeping forces of the German forces were reorganised to form large escort flotillas. T135 joined one of these escort flotillas, being part of the 2nd escort half-flotilla of the 1st Escort Flotilla in April 1918.

On 6 July 1918, the 2nd escort half-flotilla, including T135, set out to escort the submarine U-55 through the minefields. In the early morning of 7 July 1918, the escort force was about to turn back, having reached the end of the minefields, when the torpedo boats T138 and T172 struck mines and sank. T135, along with T148, had already passed over the mine barrier, and a path had to be cut through the mined area by minesweepers to allow the stranded torpedo boats to return to port. At the end of the war, T135 was part of the 2nd half-flotilla of the 1st Escort Flotilla.

After the end of the war, T135 was initially retained by the Weimar Republic's navy, the Reichsmarine, but was struck from the Naval lists on 25 May 1921. She was sold for scrap on 10 October that year and broken up at Wilhelmshaven.

== Bibliography ==
- Chesneau, Roger; Kolesnik, Eugene M., eds. (1979). Conway's All The World's Fighting Ships 1860–1905. London: Conway Maritime Press. ISBN 0-85177-133-5.
- Firle, Rudolph (1921). Der Krieg in der Ostsee: Erster Band: Von Kriegsbeginn bis Mitte März 1915. Der Krieg zur See: 1914–1918 (in German). Berlin: Verlag von E. S. Mittler und Sohn.
- Fock, Harald (1981). Schwarze Gesellen: Band 2: Zerstörer bis 1914 (in German). Herford, Germany: Koelers Verlagsgesellschaft mBH. ISBN 3-7822-0206-6.
- Fock, Harald (1989). Z-Vor! Internationale Entwicklung und Kriegseinsätze von Zerstörern und Torpedobooten 1914 bis 1939 (in German). Herford, Germany: Koehlers Verlagsgesellschaft mBH. ISBN 3-7822-0207-4.
- Gardiner, Robert; Gray, Randal, eds. (1985). Conway's All The World's Fighting Ships 1906–1921. London: Conway Maritime Press. ISBN 0-85177-245-5.
- Gladisch, Walter, ed. (1965). Der Krieg in der Nordsee: Band 7: Vom Sommer 1917 bis zum Kriegsende 1918. Frankfurt: Verlag E.S. Mittler & Sohn.
- Gröner, Erich; Jung, Dieter; Maass, Martin (1983). Die deutschen Kriegsschiffe 1815–1945: Band 2: Torpedoboote, Zerstörer, Schnellboote, Minensuchboote, Minenräumboote (in German). Koblenz: Bernard & Graef Verlag. ISBN 3-7637-4801-6.
- Halpern, Paul G. (1994). A Naval History of World War I. London: UCL Press. ISBN 1-85728-498-4.
- Hildebrand, Hans H.; Röhr, Albert; Steinmetz, Hans-Otto (1979). Die Deutchen Kreigschiffe: Biographen - ein Spiegel der Marinegeschichte von 1815 bis zur Gegenwart: Band 1 (in German). Herford, Germany: Koehlers Verlagsgesellschaft mBH. ISBN 3-7822-0209-0.
- Monograph No. 25: The Baltic 1914 (PDF). Naval Staff Monographs (Historical). Vol. VII. The Naval Staff, Training and Staff Duties Division. 1922. pp. 67–103.
- Polmar, Norman; Noot, Jurrien (1991). Submarines of the Russian and Soviet Navies, 1718–1990. Annapolis: Naval Institute Press. ISBN 0-87021-570-1.
- Rollmann, Heinrich (1929). Der Krieg in der Ostsee: Zwieter Band: Das Kriegjahr 1915. Der Krieg zur See: 1914–1918 (in German). Berlin: Verlag von E.S. Mittler & Sohn.
- Stoelzel, Albert (1930). Ehrenrangliste der Kaiserlich Deutschen Marine 1914–1918 (in German). Berlin: Thormann & Goetsch.
