= SMS G132 =

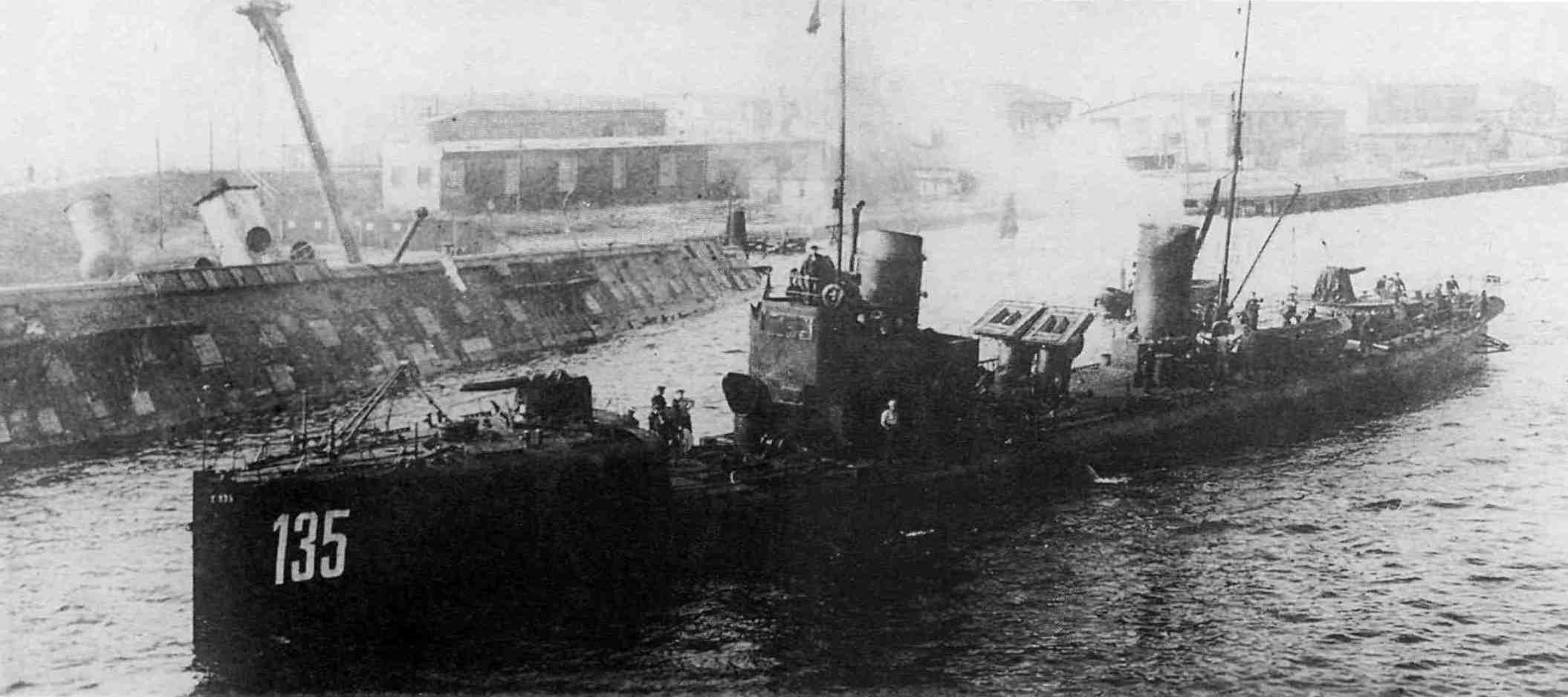
- Sister ship T135

History

German Empire
- Name: SMS G132
- Builder: Germaniawerft, Kiel
- Launched: 12 May 1906
- Commissioned: 22 August 1906
- Fate: Sold for scrap 1921

General characteristics
- Class & type: S90-class torpedo boat
- Displacement: 412 t (405 long tons)
- Length: 65.7 m (215 ft 7 in)
- Beam: 7.0 m (23 ft 0 in)
- Draft: 2.87 m (9 ft 5 in)
- Installed power: 7,000 PS (6,900 ihp; 5,100 kW)
- Propulsion: 3 × boilers; 2 × 3-cylinder triple expansion engines
- Speed: 28 kn (52 km/h; 32 mph)
- Range: 1,060 nmi (1,960 km; 1,220 mi) at 17 kn (31 km/h; 20 mph)
- Complement: 69
- Armament: 4 × 5.2 cm (2.0 in) L/55 guns; 3 × 450 mm torpedo tubes

SMS G132 (Note: "SMS" stands for German: Seiner Majestät Schiff, lit. 'His Majesty's Ship')) (Note: The "G" in G132 denoted the shipbuilder who constructed her.) was a S90-class torpedo boat of the Imperial German Navy. G132 was built by the Germaniawerft shipyard at Kiel in 1905–1906, being launched on 12 May 1906 and entering service in August that year.

The ship took part in the First World War, operating in the Baltic Sea. She was renamed SMS T132 in 1916. T132 survived the war, and was sold for scrap in 1921.

== Design ==
The S90-class consisted of 48 torpedo-boats, built between 1898 and 1907 by Schichau and Germaniawerft for the Imperial German Navy. They were larger than previous German torpedo-boats, allowing them to work effectively with the High Seas Fleet in the North Sea, while also being large enough to act as flotilla leader when necessary, thus eliminating the need for separate larger division boats. As part of the fiscal year 1905 construction programme for the Imperial German Navy, six large torpedo boats (Große Torpedoboote) (G132–G137) were ordered from Germaniawerft, with five being powered by conventional reciprocating steam engines and the last, G137, powered by steam turbines.

G132 was 65.7 m (215 ft 7 in) long overall and 65.3 m (214 ft 3 in) at the waterline, with a beam of 7.0 m (23 ft 0 in) and a draught of 2.87 m (9 ft 5 in). Displacement was 412 tonnes (405 long tons) design and 544 tonnes (535 long tons) deep load. Three coal-fired water-tube boilers fed steam at a pressure of 17.5 standard atmospheres (257 psi) to two sets of three-cylinder triple expansion engines. The ship's machinery was rated at 7,000 PS (6,900 ihp; 5,100 kW) giving a design speed of 28 knots (32 mph; 52 km/h). 139 t of coal could be carried, giving a range of 1,060 nmi (1,220 mi; 1,960 km) at 17 kn (20 mph; 31 km/h) or 2,000 nmi (2,300 mi; 3,700 km) at 12 kn (14 mph; 22 km/h). The ship had two funnels and the distinct layout of the S90-class, with a torpedo tube placed in a well deck between the raised forecastle and the ship's bridge.

G132's initial armament was four 5.2 cm (2.0 in) SK L/55 guns and three 45 cm (17.7 in) torpedo tubes. Experience from the Russo-Japanese War of 1904–1905 indicated the need for heavier gun armament, and G132 was later rearmed with one 8.8 cm (3.5 in) SL L/35 gun and two 5.2 cm SK L/55 guns, with the torpedo armament remaining unchanged. The ship had a crew of two officers and 67 other ranks, although this increased to 84 when used as a flotilla leader.

== Construction and service ==
G132 was laid down at Germaniawerft's Kiel shipyard as Yard number 114. The ship was launched on 12 May 1906 and was completed on 22 August 1906. Cost of the 1905 torpedo boats varied between 1.171 and 1.195 Million marks.

In 1907, G132 was a member of the 5th half-flotilla, part of the 1st School Flotilla. In 1908, the 5th half-flotilla, including G132, had transferred to the active 1st Manoeuvre Flotilla. In 1909, G132 had transferred to the 9th half-flotilla, but remained part of the Manoeuvre Flotilla. In 1911, G132 was listed as part of the 5th half-flotilla of the 3rd Torpedo boat Flotilla, remaining part of that unit through 1912, and into 1913, although the flotilla was now a reserve formation.

=== First World War ===
In September 1914, in a re-organisation of the German Baltic Fleet, G132 was one of five torpedo boats (Note: G132, G133, G134, G135 and G136.) transferred to the Baltic to replace the more modern V186 and V26, which transferred to the North Sea. G132, G133, G134 and G136 were used to form the new 20th half-flotilla, which was based in Danzig, Prussia (now Gdańsk, Poland) for operations in the Eastern Baltic. From 24 to 30 October 1914, the 20th half-flotilla took part in a sortie of cruisers into the Gulf of Finland, with the intention of luring the Russian Baltic Fleet out in pursuit where it could be attacked by German submarines. On 17 November, G132, G133 and G136, together with the cruisers Lübeck and Amazone carried out an attack on Libau (now Liepāja, Latvia), shelling the port, with four blockships being sank at the entrance to the port.

On 22 January 1915, G132 was one of eight torpedo boats (Note: G132, G133, G134, G135, G136, S129, T97 and S131.) that accompanied the cruisers Prinz Adalbert and Augsburg in a sweep north of Gotland, with Libau being shelled on the return journey. On 25 January, Augsburg struck a mine east of Bornholm and was taken under tow by G132. From 13 to 15 April 1915, G132, together with the torpedo boats S138 and S141, and the cruisers Prinz Adalbert, Lübeck and Thetis escorted the minelayer Deutschland on a minelaying mission in the Gulf of Finland. Later that month, G132 was transferred to the 7th half-flotilla, with duties of patrolling the Øresund.

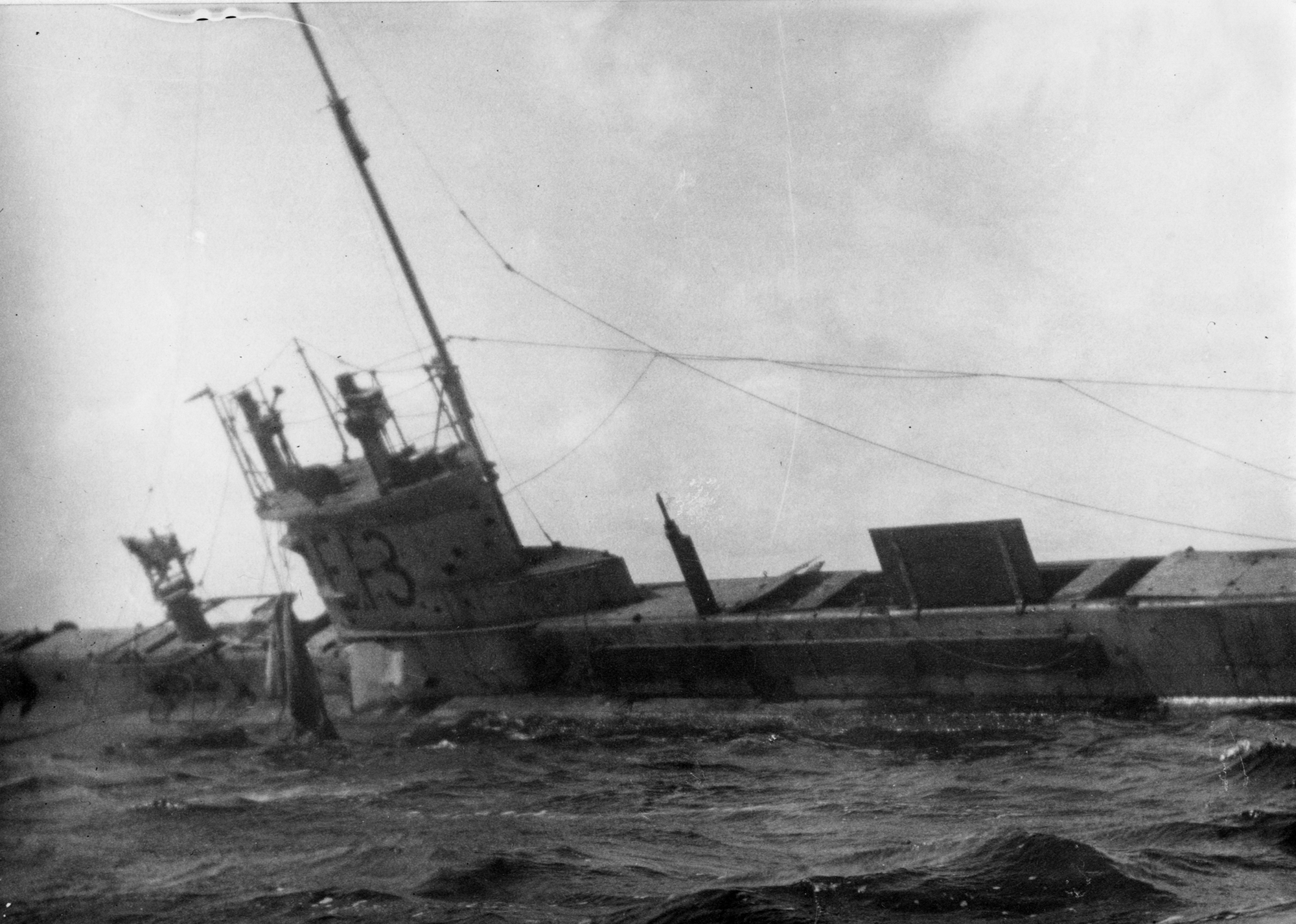
The British submarine E13 aground after being attacked by G132

On the night of 18/19 August 1915, the British submarine E13, ran aground in Danish territorial waters near Saltholm in the Øresund. The Danish torpedo boat Narhvalen arrived at on the morning of 19 August and her commanding officer informed E13 that the submarine had 24 hours to leave Danish waters before being interned. G132 then arrived and finding that the submarine was guarded by two Danish torpedo boats (Støren and Søulven), left. G132's commanding officer, Oberleutnant zur See Paul Graf von Montgelas, reported the presence of E13 by radio. The German commander of the Baltic Coast Defence Division, Rear Admiral Robert Mischke, then ordered G132 to sink E13. G132 then returned (Note: British sources claim that G132 was accompanied by another torpedo boat, but German sources do not mention the second vessel.) and proceeded to attack E13, firing a torpedo that failed to hit, and shelling the submarine. E13's crew then abandoned ship, but G132 continued to fire at them, and the firing only stopped when Søulven placed herself between G132 and the survivors. The incident resulted in strong diplomatic protests by Denmark about the violation of the country's neutrality.

The ship was later employed as a flagship for minesweeper and submarine flotillas. In May 1916, G132 was attached to the 5th submarine half-flotilla, operating in the Baltic. On 27 September 1916, the ship was renamed T132, in order to free her number for new construction, in this case the torpedo boat S132. At the end of the war, T132 was attached to the 4th Minesweeping Flotilla, based at Cuxhaven. After the end of the war, T132 was initially retained by the Weimar Republic's navy, the Reichsmarine, but was struck from the Naval lists on 22 March 1921 and sold for scrap in 28 May that year.

== Bibliography ==
- Chesneau, Roger; Kolesnik, Eugene M., eds. (1979). Conway's All The World's Fighting Ships 1860–1905. London: Conway Maritime Press. ISBN 0-85177-133-5.
- Firle, Rudolph (1921). Der Krieg in der Ostsee: Erster Band: Von Kriegsbeginn bis Mitte März 1915. Der Krieg zur See: 1914–1918 (in German). Berlin: Verlag von E. S. Mittler und Sohn.
- Fock, Harald (1981). Schwarze Gesellen: Band 2: Zerstörer bis 1914 (in German). Herford, Germany: Koelers Verlagsgesellschaft mBH. ISBN 3-7822-0206-6.
- Fock, Harald (1989). Z-Vor! Internationale Entwicklung und Kriegseinsätze von Zerstörern und Torpedobooten 1914 bis 1939 (in German). Herford, Germany: Koehlers Verlagsgesellschaft mBH. ISBN 3-7822-0207-4.
- Gardiner, Robert; Gray, Randal, eds. (1985). Conway's All The World's Fighting Ships 1906–1921. London: Conway Maritime Press. ISBN 0-85177-245-5.
- Gröner, Erich; Jung, Dieter; Maass, Martin (1983). Die deutschen Kriegsschiffe 1815–1945: Band 2: Torpedoboote, Zerstörer, Schnellboote, Minensuchboote, Minenräumboote (in German). Koblenz: Bernard & Graef Verlag. ISBN 3-7637-4801-6.
- Halpern, Paul G. (1994). A Naval History of World War I. London: UCL Press. ISBN 1-85728-498-4.
- Kemp, Paul (1999). The Admiralty Regrets: British Warship Losses of the 20th Century. Stroud, UK: Sutton Publishing Limited. ISBN 0-7509-1567-6.
- Monograph No. 25: The Baltic 1914 (PDF). Naval Staff Monographs (Historical). Vol. VII. The Naval Staff, Training and Staff Duties Division. 1922. pp. 67–103.
- Rollmann, Heinrich (1929). Der Krieg in der Ostsee: Zwieter Band: Das Kriegjahr 1915. Der Krieg zur See: 1914–1918 (in German). Berlin: Verlag von E.S. Mittler & Sohn.
- Stoelzel, Albert (1930). Ehrenrangliste der Kaiserlich Deutschen Marine 1914–1918 (in German). Berlin: Thormann & Goetsch.
