= SMS G113 =

S90-class torpedo boat

History

German Empire
- Builder: Germaniawerft, Kiel, Germany
- Launched: 9 August 1902
- Commissioned: 16 October 1902
- Fate: Stricken 22 March 1921

General characteristics
- Displacement: 440 t (433 long tons)
- Length: 65.8 m (215 ft 11 in)
- Beam: 6.7 m (22 ft 0 in)
- Draught: 2.87 m (9 ft 5 in)
- Installed power: 6,013 PS (5,931 ihp; 4,423 kW)
- Propulsion: 3 × water-tube boilers; 2× Triple expansion steam engines; 2 shafts
- Speed: 29 kn (54 km/h; 33 mph)
- Range: 1,225 nmi (2,269 km; 1,410 mi) at 17 knots (31 km/h; 20 mph)
- Armament: 3 × 50 mm guns; × 450 mm torpedo tubes

SMS G113 was an S90-class torpedo boat built for the German Kaiserliche Marine (Imperial Navy) in the 1900s

== Design ==
G113 was 65.8 metres (215 ft 11 in) long overall and 65.5 metres (214 ft 11 in) between perpendiculars, with a beam of 6.7 metres (22 ft 0 in) and a draught of 2.87 metres (9 ft 5 in). Displacement was 330 tonnes (320 long tons) normal and 440 tonnes (430 long tons) full load. Three coal-fired water-tube boilers fed steam to two sets of triple-expansion steam engines rated at 6,013 metric horsepower (5,931 ihp; 4,423 kW), giving a speed of 29 knots (54 km/h; 33 mph). 112 tonnes (110 long tons) of coal was carried, giving a range of 1,225 nautical miles (2,269 km; 1,410 mi) at 17 knots (31 km/h; 20 mph).

Armament consisted of three 5 cm SK L/40 guns in single mounts, together with three 450 millimetres (17.7 in) torpedo tubes, with two spare torpedoes. The ship was later re-armed, with an 8.8 cm gun replacing one of the 5.0 cm guns.

== Service history ==
G113 was launched at Germaniawerft's Kiel shipyard on 9 August 1902, and commissioned on 16 October 1902. In May 1907, she was a member of the 1st Half Flotilla. In May 1914, she was the leader of the IV Torpedoboat Flotilla (a reserve unit), and remained leader of IV Flotilla in October 1914. She was renamed T113 on 4 September 1914. In April 1915, T113 was a member of the 7th Torpedo-boat Half Flotilla, operating in the Baltic Sea. By May 1916, T113 was part of a harbour protection flotilla for the Elbe and by the end of the war, was one of 36 torpedo boats forming the 1st Escort Flotilla.
