= S90-class torpedo boat =

German Imperial Navy boat

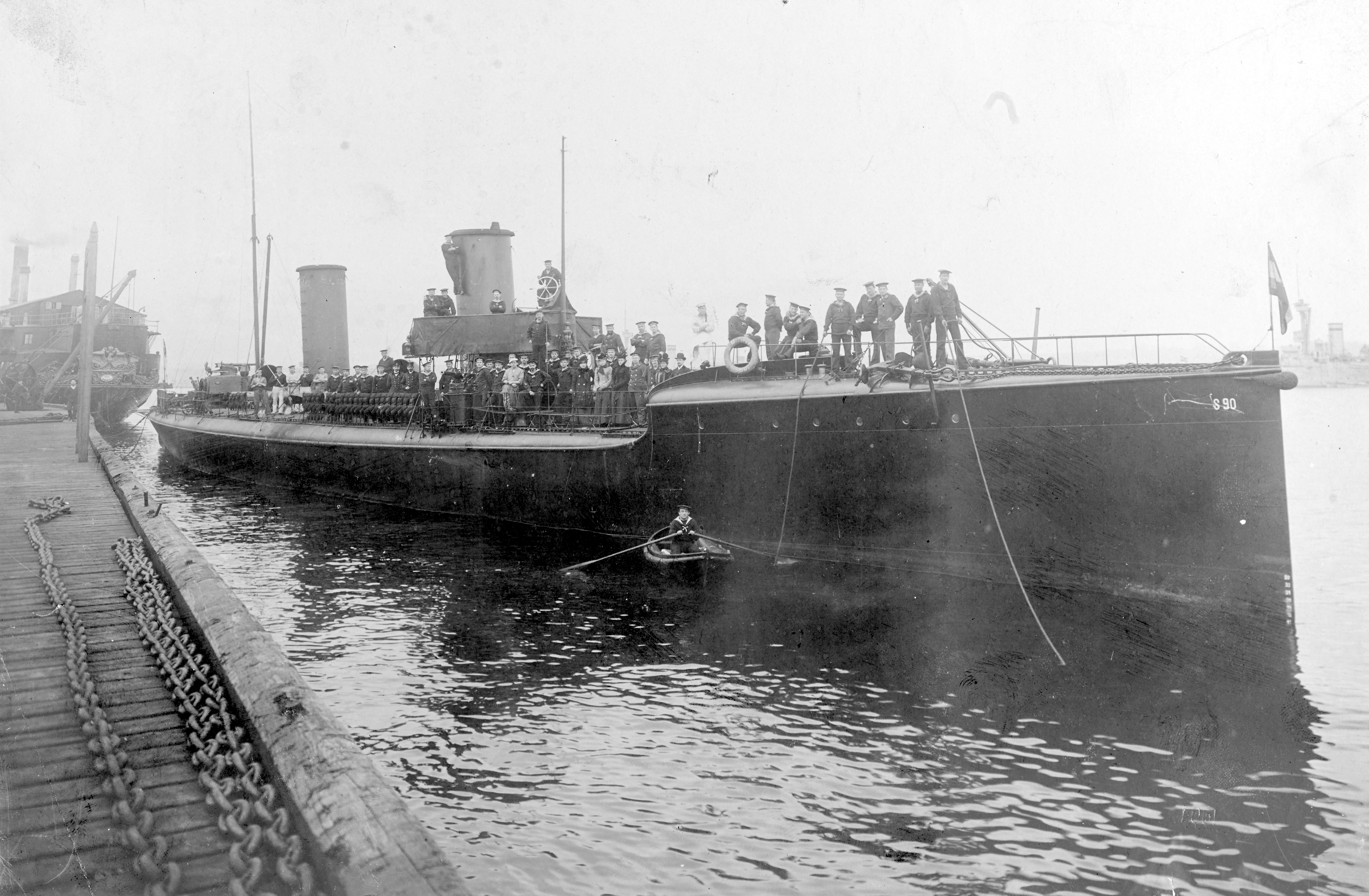
- S90 in Kiel, c. 1901

Class overview
- Builders: Schichau (S), Germaniawerft (G)
- Operators: Imperial German Navy
- Preceded by: SMS D10
- Succeeded by: S138 class
- Built: 1899–1907
- In commission: 1899–1921
- Completed: 48

General characteristics
- Class & type: S90 class
- Displacement: 412 tonnes (405 long tons) designed; 544 tonnes (535 long tons) full load
- Length: 65.70 m (215 ft 7 in) o/a
- Beam: 7 m (23 ft)
- Draft: 2.63 m (8 ft 8 in)
- Propulsion: 2-shaft VTE; 3 marine boilers; 6,783 ihp (5.058 MW)
- Speed: 28 kn (52 km/h; 32 mph)
- Range: 2,000 nmi (3,700 km; 2,300 mi) at 12 knots (22 km/h; 14 mph)
- Complement: 2 officers, 67 enlisted
- Armament: S90–107: 3 × 5 cm (2.0 in) SK L/40 guns; 3 × 45 cm (17.7 in) torpedo tubes; G132–134: 4 × 5.2 cm (2.0 in) SK L/55 guns; 3 × 45 cm (17.7 in) torpedo tubes; G135 and 136: 1 × 8.8 cm (3.46 in) SK L/35 gun; 2 × 5.2 cm (2 in) SK L/55 guns; 3 × 45 cm (17.7 in) torpedo tubes

The S90 class of torpedo boats was a group of large torpedo boats built for the German Imperial Navy (Kaiserliche Marine) in the early 20th century. They were Hochsee-Torpedoboot ("High seas torpedo boat") built to varying designs by Schichau at Elbing (36 vessels) and Germaniawerft at Kiel (12 vessels). German torpedo boats were designated by shipbuilder, with the first letter of their designation reflecting their builder.

== Design ==
=== General characteristics and machinery ===
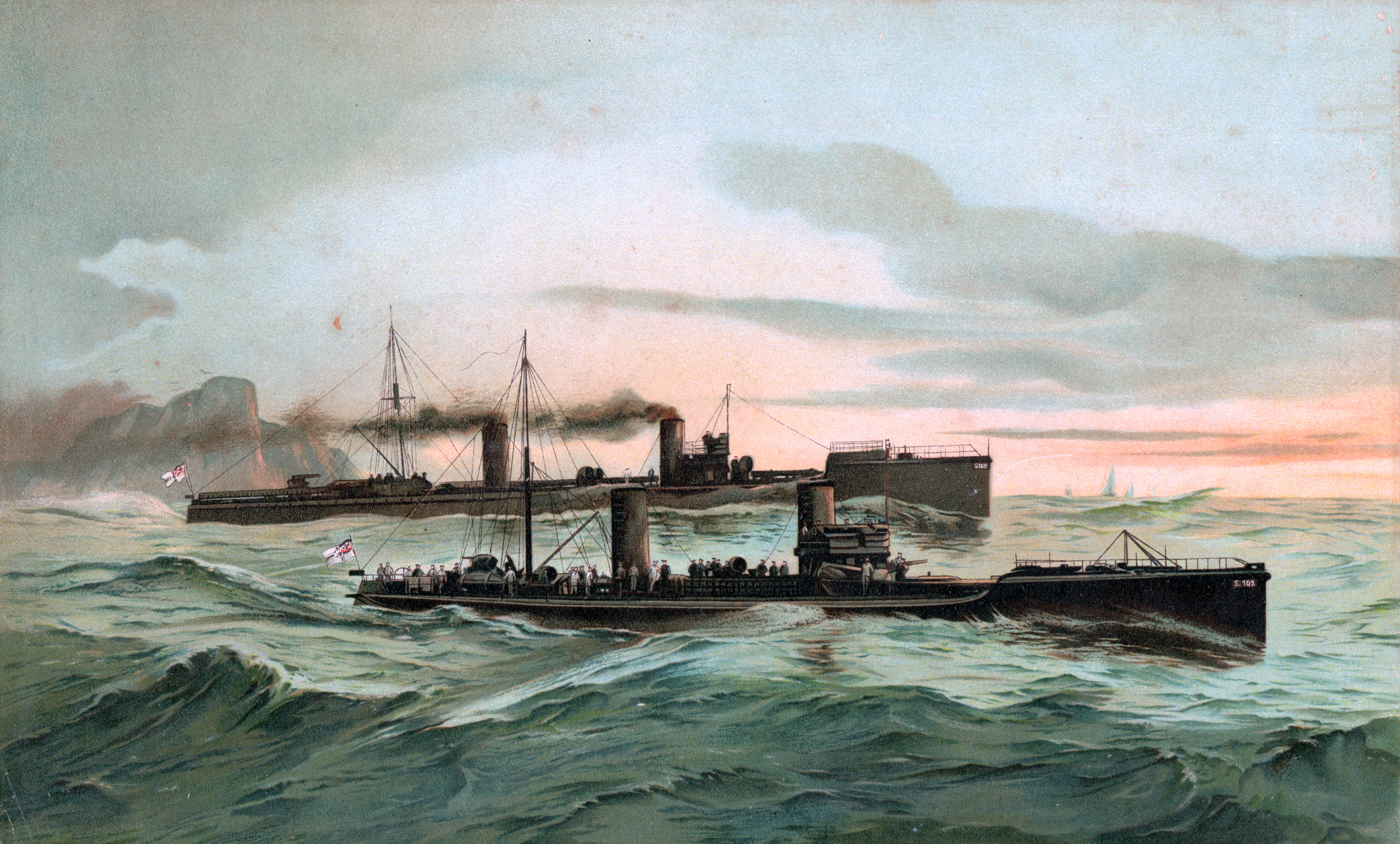
1902 lithograph of G108 and S102

These 48 vessels were built to ten different designs over the period 1898 to 1907. Thus they varied in dimensions, and they gradually increased in size as more vessels were built. The boats were 62.70 to 68.50 meters (205 ft 9 in to 224 ft 9 in) long at the waterline and 63 to 71.50 m (206 ft 8 in to 234 ft 7 in) long overall. They had beam (nautical) of 7 to 7.65 m (23 ft 0 in to 25 ft 1 in) and a draft of 2.03 to 3.22 m (6 ft 8 in to 10 ft 7 in). The hull for each boat was divided into eleven watertight compartments, though after G132, a twelfth compartment was added. They had a crew of two officers and fifty-five enlisted men, though some of the boats had larger crews; S120 had four more sailors, while G132 had twelve more men, and G131 had a crew of three officers and 78 enlisted. When serving as half-flotilla flagships, the boats would have a flotilla leader's staff of four officers and eleven enlisted men in addition to the standard crew. The vessels carried a yawl and a dinghy apiece.

The S90-class boats were propelled by a pair of vertical, 3-cylinder triple expansion steam engines that drove a pair of three-bladed screw propellers. Steam was provided by three coal-fired water-tube boilers. Two boats, S125 and G137, were fitted with Parsons steam turbines instead of the older reciprocating engines; G137 also received an additional boiler. The reciprocating engine-powered boats were rated at 27 to 30 knots (50 to 56 km/h; 31 to 35 mph) from 5,900 to 7,000 indicated horsepower (4,400 to 5,200 kW). Meanwhile, S125 and G137 were rated at 6,600 shaft horsepower (4,900 kW) and 28 knots (52 km/h; 32 mph), and 10,800 shp (8,100 kW) and 30 knots (56 km/h; 35 mph), respectively. The boats had storage capacity for 93 to 168 t (92 to 165 long tons; 103 to 185 short tons) of coal. As a result, cruising radius varied significantly, from 830 to 1,500 nautical miles (1,540 to 2,780 km; 960 to 1,730 mi) at 17 knots (31 km/h; 20 mph). Each vessel was equipped with one or two 4 to 8 kilowatts (5.4 to 10.7 hp) 110-Volt generators for electrical power. Steering was controlled with a pair of rudders, one at the stern and the other in the bow.

=== Armament ===
Most of the ships of the class were armed with a main battery of three 5 cm (2.0 in) SK L/40 guns in single pivot mounts. They were supplied with a total of 252 shells that weighed 1.75 kg (3 lb 14 oz). The guns had a muzzle velocity of 656 m/s (2,150 ft/s) and a maximum range of 6,200 yd (5,700 m) at their highest elevation of 20 degrees. G132, G133, G134, and G136 were equipped with four 5.2 cm (2 in) SK L/55 guns in single gun mounts. These guns fired a similar 1.75 kg shell at a muzzle velocity of 850 m/s (2,800 ft/s). The guns could elevate up to 20 degrees, at a maximum range of 7,100 m (7,800 yd). G135 was equipped with two of the 5.2 cm guns and one 8.8 cm (3.5 in) gun, while G137 had three 5.2 cm guns and one 8.8 cm gun. The 8.8 cm gun fired a shell weighing 7 kg (15 lb) at a muzzle velocity of 690 m/s (2,300 ft/s). The gun could be elevated to 25 degrees, for a maximum range of 8,790 m (9,610 yd). Many of the boats were rearmed throughout their time in service, trading their 5 cm or 5.2 cm guns for the more powerful 8.8 cm guns. All ships of the class carried three 45 cm (17.7 in) deck-mounted single torpedo tubes with five torpedoes.

== Ships in class ==
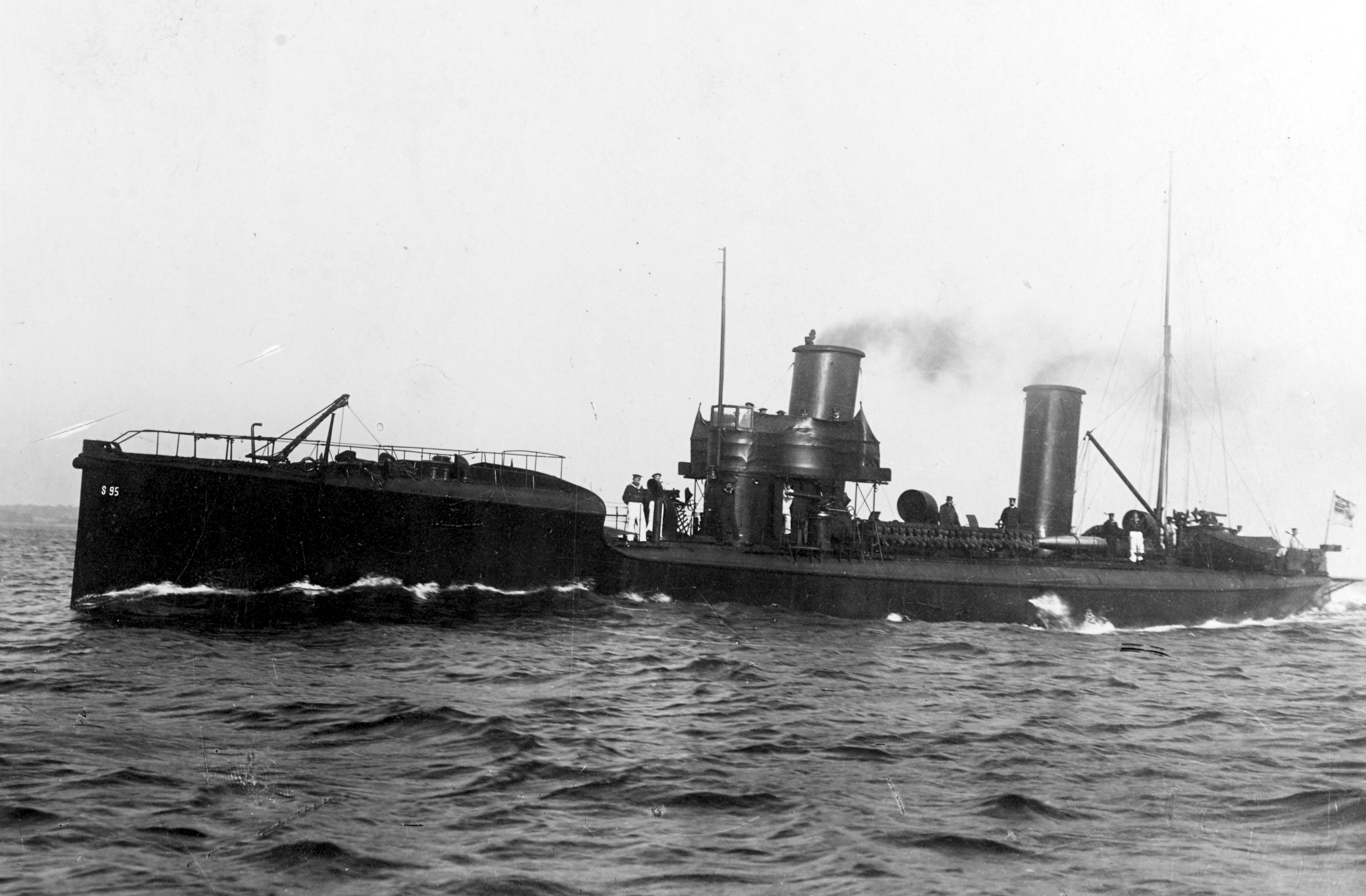
S95 in Kiel, c. 1900–09

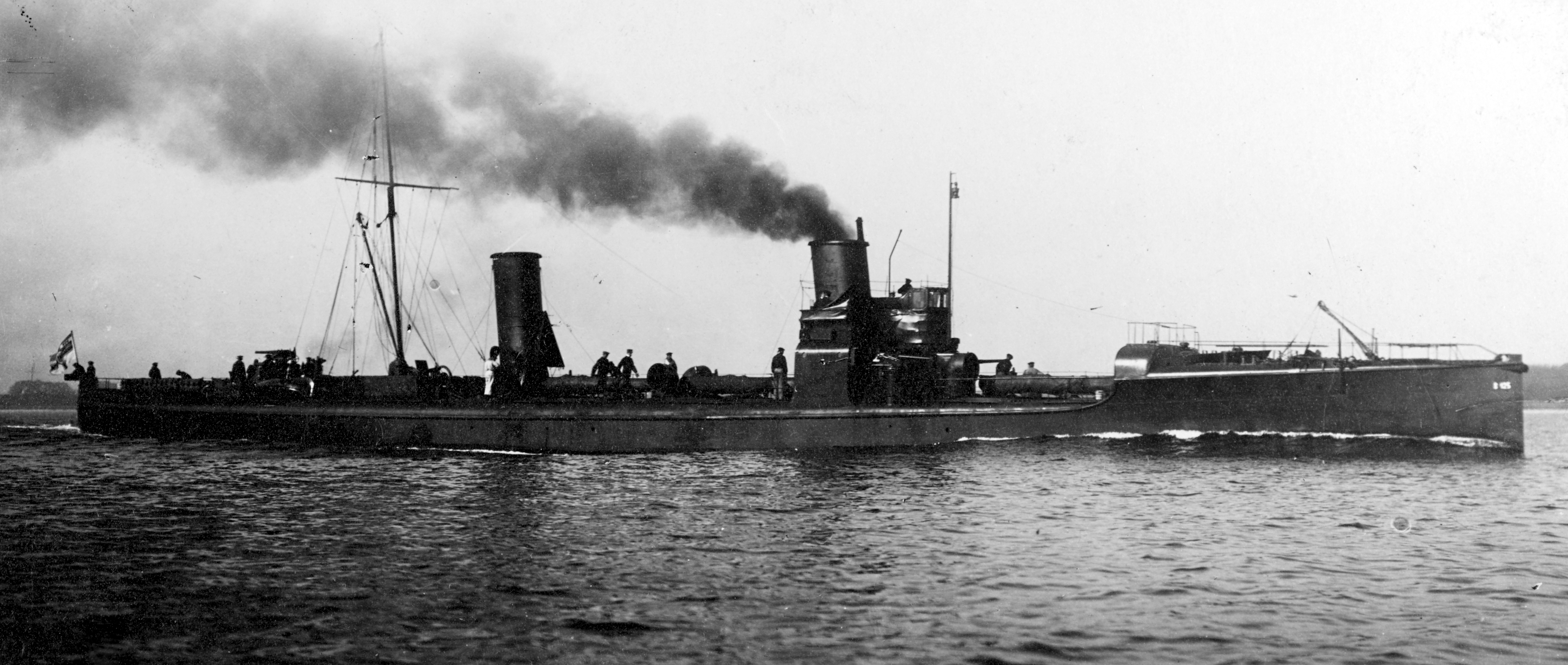
S125 in Kiel

G137 on trials in 1907

Boat	Laid down	Launched	Commissioned	Fate
S90		26 July 1899	24 October 1899	Scuttled 17 October 1914
S91		25 September 1899	24 April 1900	Stricken 22 March 1921; sold 26 May 1921 for scrap
S92		15 May 1900	27 June 1900	Stricken 22 March 1921; sold 26 May 1921 for scrap
S93		24 March 1900	14 July 1900	Stricken 22 March 1921; sold 26 May 1921 for scrap
S94		23 April 1900	27 July 1900	Stricken 26 October 1920; sold 13 May 1921 for scrap
S95		20 February 1900	29 August 1900	Stricken 22 March 1921; sold 13 May 1921 for scrap
S96		31 January 1900	27 September 1900	Stricken 22 March 1921; sold 26 May 1921 for scrap
S97		16 December 1899	28 May 1900	Stricken 22 March 1921; sold 26 May 1921 for scrap
S98		28 July 1900	4 November 1900	Stricken 22 March 1921; sold 26 May 1921 for scrap
S99		4 September 1900	13 December 1900	Stricken 22 March 1921; sold 26 May 1921 for scrap
S100		13 November 1900	18 April 1901	Sunk in collision in the Baltic with ferry Preussen on 15 October 1915
S101		22 December 1900	30 May 1901	Stricken 22 March 1921; sold 13 May 1921 for scrap
S102		18 April 1901	18 July 1901	Stricken 22 March 1921; sold 13 May 1921 for scrap
S103		15 May 1901	17 September 1901	Stricken 22 March 1921; sold 26 May 1921 for scrap
S104		22 June 1901	7 October 1901	Stricken 22 March 1921; sold 26 May 1921 for scrap
S105		7 August 1901	17 November 1901	Stricken 22 March 1921; sold 26 May 1921 for scrap
S106		7 September 1901	9 December 1901	Stricken 22 March 1921; sold 26 May 1921 for scrap
S107		17 October 1901	27 January 1902	Stricken 22 March 1921; sold 13 May 1921 for scrap
G108		7 September 1901	26 March 1902	Stricken 22 March 1921; broken up at Hamburg
G109		9 November 1901	19 June 1902	Stricken 22 March 1921; sold 13 May 1921 for scrap
G110		9 September 1902	21 January 1903	Stricken 22 March 1921; broken up at Hamburg
G111		2 April 1902	21 July 1902	Stricken 22 March 1921; sold 13 June 1921 for scrap
G112		19 June 1902	6 September 1902	Stricken 22 March 1920; sold 13 June 1921 for scrap
G113		9 August 1902	16 October 1902	Stricken 22 March 1921; sold 8 June 1921 for scrap
S114		9 August 1902	25 October 1902	Stricken 9 November 1920; sold 7 July 1921 for scrap
S115		10 September 1902	22 February 1903	Sunk by gunfire from HMS Undaunted and four destroyers in the Battle off Texel on 17 October 1914
S116		14 October 1902	28 March 1903	Sunk by torpedo from HM submarine E.9 in North Sea on 6 October 1914
S117		4 February 1903	21 May 1903	Sunk by gunfire from HMS Undaunted and four destroyers in the Battle off Texel on 17 October 1914
S118		21 March 1903	9 July 1903	Sunk by gunfire from HMS Undaunted and four destroyers in the Battle off Texel on 17 October 1914
S119		8 July 1903	6 September 1903	Sunk by gunfire from HMS Undaunted and four destroyers in the Battle off Texel on 17 October 1914
S120		10 February 1904	7 May 1904	Stricken 22 March 1921; sold 28 May 1921 for scrap
S121		3 March 1904	17 June 1904	Stricken 22 March 1920; sold 13 June 1921 for scrap
S122		23 April 1904	5 August 1904	Sunk by mine in the North Sea on 5 October 1918
S123		25 June 1904	23 August 1904	Sunk by mine in the North Sea on 1 May 1916
S124		3 August 1904	8 October 1904	Sunk in the Baltic by collision with Danish ss Anglodane on 30 November 1914
S125		19 May 1904	4 April 1905	Stricken 26 October 1920; sold 13 May 1921 for scrap
S126		26 November 1904	30 April 1905	Stricken 22 March 1920; sold 13 June 1921 for scrap
S127		12 January 1905	7 June 1905	Stricken 22 March 1921; sold 28 May 1921 for scrap
S128		25 February 1905	8 July 1905	Stricken 22 March 1920; sold 13 June 1921 for scrap
S129		4 March 1905	10 August 1905	Wrecked in the North Sea on 5 November 1915
S130		27 April 1905	17 September 1905	Stricken 22 March 1921; sold 28 May 1921 for scrap
S131		25 May 1905	6 October 1905	Stricken 22 March 1921; sold 28 May 1921 for scrap
G132		12 May 1906	22 August 1906	Stricken 22 March 1921; sold 28 May 1921 for scrap
G133		30 June 1906	10 December 1906	Stricken 22 March 1921; sold 28 May 1921 for scrap
G134		23 July 1906	6 March 1907	Stricken 9 November 1920; sold 13 May 1921 for scrap
G135		7 September 1906	24 January 1907	Stricken 25 May 1921; 10 October 1921 for scrap
G136		25 August 1906	16 March 1907	Stricken 21 July 1921; 20 August 1921 for scrap
G137		24 January 1907	24 July 1907	Stricken 22 March 1921, sold 28 May 1921 for scrap

== Service history ==
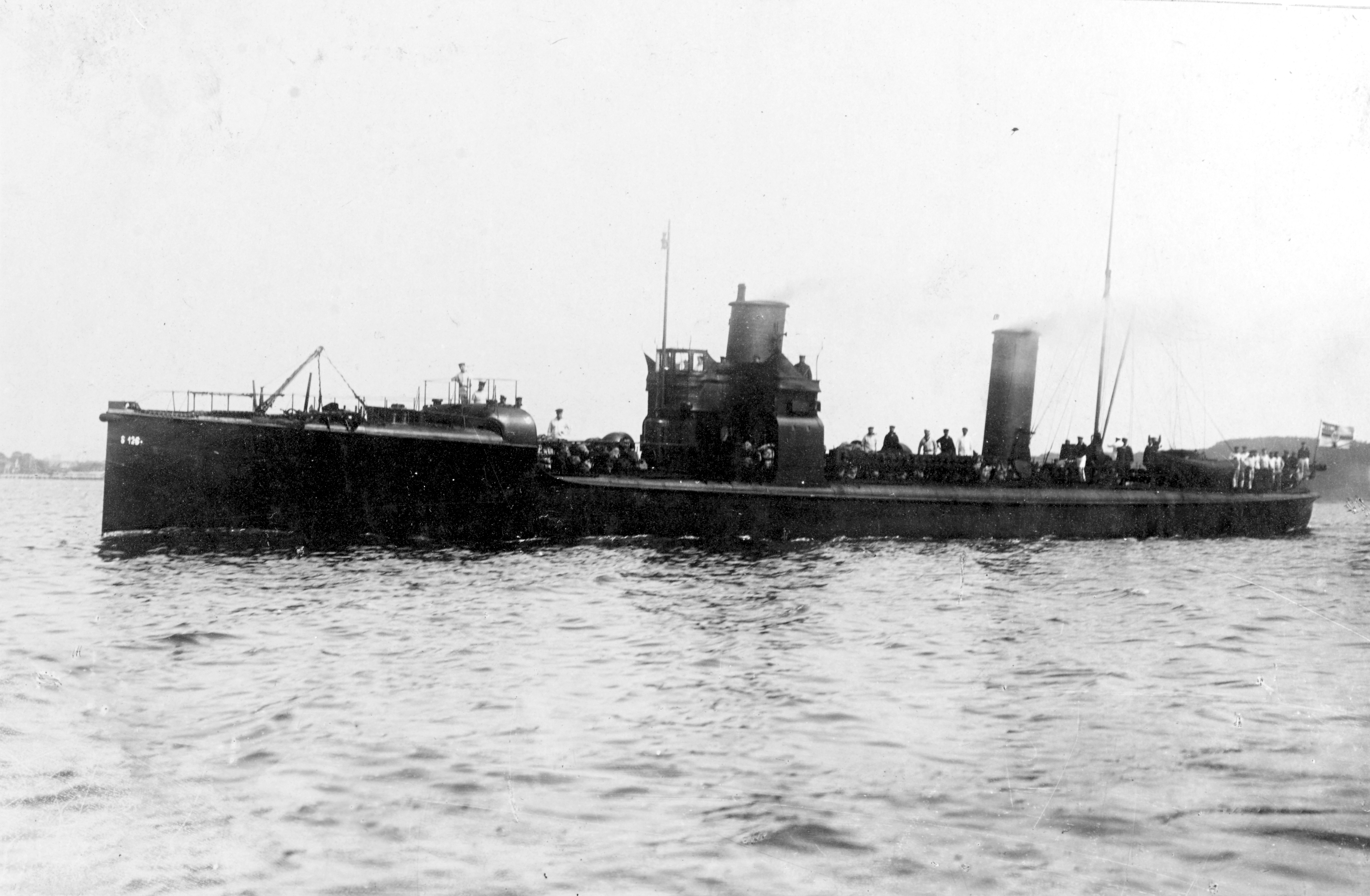
S126 in Kiel, c. 1910

Most of the ships served into World War I. S90 sank the Japanese cruiser Takachiho on 17 October 1914, and was scuttled at Tsingtao later that day. Four of these boats took part in the Battle off Texel on the exact same day, in which a British light cruiser and four destroyers destroyed the Seventh Half-Flotilla consisting of S119, S115, S117 and S118.
