= USS Aurora =

Minesweeper of the United States Navy

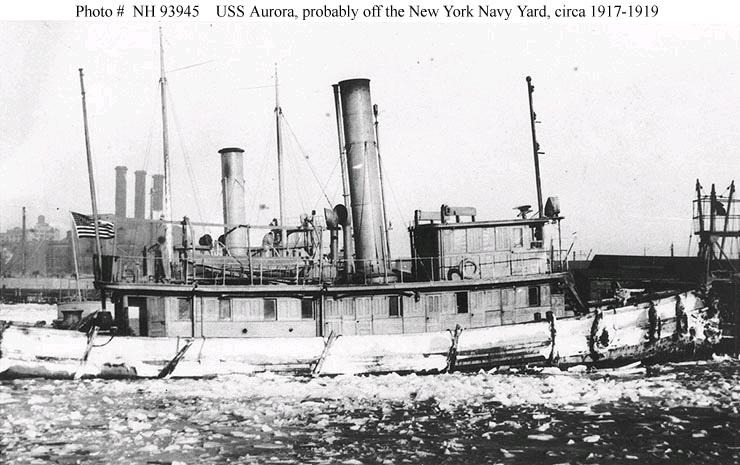
- Aurora circa 1917-1919

History

United States
- Builder: Dialogue & Company
- Launched: 1906
- Acquired: August 1917
- Commissioned: 22 September 1917
- Decommissioned: 24 March 1919
- Homeport: Port Richmond, New York; Tompkinsville, New York

General characteristics
- Displacement: 234 tons
- Length: 110 ft (34 m)
- Beam: 26.7 ft (8.1 m)
- Speed: 12 knots
- Complement: 20
- Armament: 1 one pounder

USS Aurora (SP-345) was a harbor tug and a minesweeper of the United States Navy.

Built in 1906 in Camden, New Jersey, by John H. Dialogue, the Aurora was originally used for civilian purposes. In August 1917, the ship was chartered from Lehigh Valley Railroad, the owners at that time, and was commissioned on 22 September 1917 as a minesweeper in New York Harbor. In December 1918, Aurora was transferred to the Naval Overseas Transportation Service for use as a tugboat in Tompkinsville, New York. Aurora was decommissioned on 24 March 1919 and immediately returned to her owner.
