= SMS G137 =

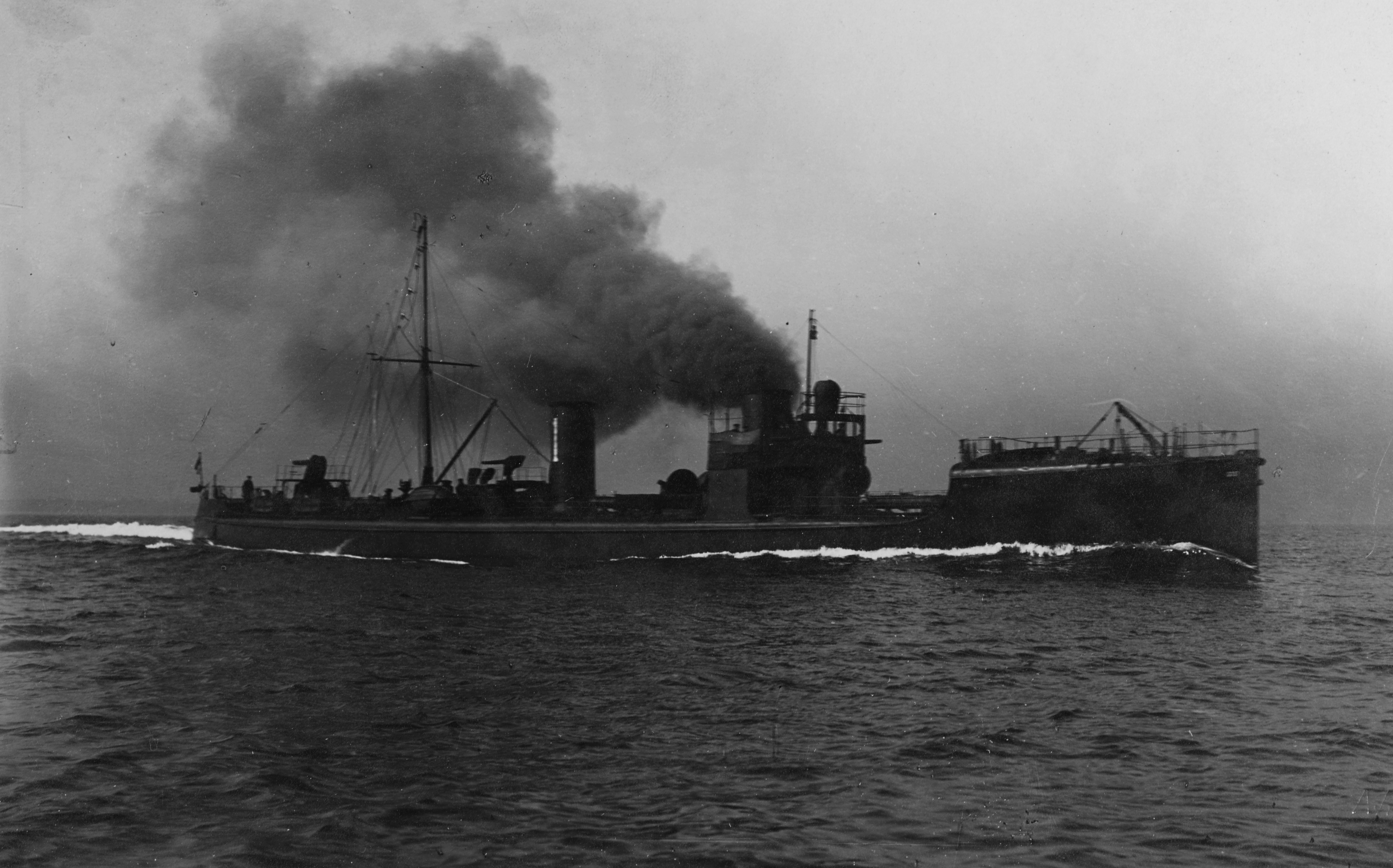

History

German Empire
- Name: SMS G137
- Builder: Germaniawerft, Kiel
- Launched: 24 January 1907
- Commissioned: 24 July 1907
- Renamed: SMS T137: 27 September 1916
- Fate: Sold for scrap 1921

General characteristics
- Class & type: S90-class torpedo boat
- Displacement: 580 t (570 long tons)
- Length: 71.6 m (234 ft 11 in) oa
- Beam: 7.65 m (25 ft 1 in)
- Draft: 3.22 m (10 ft 7 in)
- Installed power: 10,800 PS (10,700 shp; 7,900 kW)
- Propulsion: 4 × coal-fired boilers; Parsons steam turbines
- Speed: 30 kn (56 km/h; 35 mph)
- Complement: 80
- Armament: 1 x 8.8 cm (3.5 in) SL L/35 gun; 3 × 5.2 cm (2.0 in) L/55 guns; 3 × 450 mm torpedo tubes

SMS G137 (Note: "SMS" stands for German: Seiner Majestät Schiff, lit. 'His Majesty's Ship') (Note: The "G" in G137 denoted the shipbuilder who constructed her.) was a S90-class torpedo boat of the Imperial German Navy. G137 was the final ship of the class and was propelled with steam turbines rather than the triple-expansion steam engines used by the majority of the class. G137 was built by the Germaniawerft shipyard at Kiel in 1906–1907, being launched on 24 January 1907 and entering service in July that year.

G137 was used for second-line tasks during the First World War, including training and as a tender to U-boat flotillas. G137 was renamed T137 in 1916. T137 survived the war, and was sold for scrap in 1921.

== Design ==
The S90 class consisted of 48 torpedo boats, built between 1898 and 1907 by Schichau and Germaniawerft for the Imperial German Navy. They were larger than previous German torpedo boats, allowing them to work effectively with the High Seas Fleet in the North Sea, while also being large enough to act as flotilla leader when necessary, thus eliminating the need for separate larger division boats. As part of the fiscal year 1905 construction programme for the Imperial German Navy, six large torpedo boats (Große Torpedoboote) (G132–G137) were ordered from Germaniawerft, with five being powered by conventional reciprocating steam engines and the last, G137, powered by steam turbines. While the German Navy's previous turbine-powered torpedo boat, S125 (ordered as part of the 1903 programme) had been of similar size and power to the other, conventionally powered torpedo boats ordered under that programme, for G137 it was decided to enlarge the ship, fitting more powerful machinery to give greater speed. The larger hull of G137 formed the basis for the reciprocating engine-powered torpedo boats of the 1906 construction programme (S138–S149), the first ships of the S138-class torpedo boats.

G137 was 71.6 m (234 ft 11 in) long overall and 68.5 m (224 ft 9 in) at the waterline, with a beam of 7.65 m (25 ft 1 in) and a draught of 3.22 m (10 ft 7 in). The ship had a design displacement of 580 tonnes (570 long tons) which increased to 693 tonnes (682 long tons) at deep load. Four coal-fired water-tube boilers fed steam at a pressure of 17 standard atmospheres (250 psi) to a set of Parsons steam turbines. This consisted of one high-pressure turbine, two low-pressure turbines, one cruising turbine and two reverse turbines, which drove three propeller shafts. The high-pressure turbine drove the central shaft, while the low-pressure turbines drove the two outer shafts. The cruising turbine drove the right shaft, while the reversing turbines drove the two outer shafts. (Note: Gröner et al. states that G137 had a single engine room, while Fock states that the ship had two engine rooms.) The machinery was rated at 10,800 PS (10,700 shp; 7,900 kW), giving a design speed of 30 kn (35 mph; 56 km/h) (which compared to a design speed of 28 kn (32 mph; 52 km/h) produced by 7,000 ihp (5,200 kW) for G132–G136).

The ship had a gun armament of one 8.8 cm (3.5 in) SK L/35 gun (Note: SK stood for Schnellfeuerkanone (quick-firing gun) or Schnellade-Kanone (fast-loading gun).) (Note: In Imperial German Navy gun nomenclature, the L/35 denotes the length of the gun. In this case, the L/35 gun is 35 caliber, meaning that the gun has an overall length 35 times greater than the gun's bore.) and three 5.2 cm SK L/55 guns. Torpedo armament consisted of three 45 cm (17.7 in) torpedo tubes with two spare torpedoes carried. The ship had a crew of 2 officers and 78 other ranks in normal service, to which was added a further 4 officers and 11 other ranks when in use as a flotilla leader.

== Construction and service ==
G137 was laid down at Germaniawerft's Kiel shipyard as Yard number 125. She was launched on 24 January 1907. The ship reached a speed of 33 kn (38 mph; 61 km/h) during sea trials. G137 was commissioned on 24 July 1907. Construction costs were 1.99 million marks.

In 1909, G137 was leader of the Manoeuvre Flotilla. In 1911, G137 was leader of the 3rd Torpedo Boat Flotilla, remaining part of that unit through 1912 and into 1913, although the flotilla was now a reserve formation.

In 1914, G137 was being used for training, and the ship was modified to use oil rather than coal at the Kaiserliche Werft, Kiel in 1914–1915. By May 1916, G137 was serving as a tender to the 3rd U-boat half-flotilla. G137 was renamed T137 on 27 September 1916, in order to free her number for new construction, in this case the 1916 Mobilisation type torpedo boat S137. T137 remained attached to the 3rd U-boat flotilla at the end of the First World War.

After the end of the war, T137 was initially retained by the Weimar Republic's navy, the Reichsmarine, but was struck from the Naval lists on 22 March 1921. She was sold for scrap on 20 May that year and broken up at Wilhelmshaven.

== Bibliography ==
- Chesneau, Roger; Kolesnik, Eugene M., eds. (1979). Conway's All The World's Fighting Ships 1860–1905. London: Conway Maritime Press. ISBN 0-85177-133-5.
- Fock, Harald (1981). Schwarze Gesellen: Band 2: Zerstörer bis 1914 (in German). Herford, Germany: Koelers Verlagsgesellschaft mBH. ISBN 3-7822-0206-6.
- Fock, Harald (1989). Z-Vor! Internationale Entwicklung und Kriegseinsätze von Zerstörern und Torpedobooten 1914 bis 1939 (in German). Herford, Germany: Koehlers Verlagsgesellschaft mBH. ISBN 3-7822-0207-4.
- Friedman, Norman (2011). Naval Weapons of World War One: Guns, Torpedoes, Mines and ASW Weapons of All Nations: An Illustrated Directory. Barnsley, UK: Seaforth Publishing. ISBN 978-1-84832-100-7.
- Gardiner, Robert; Gray, Randal, eds. (1985). Conway's All The World's Fighting Ships 1906–1921. London: Conway Maritime Press. ISBN 0-85177-245-5.
- Gröner, Erich; Jung, Dieter; Maass, Martin (1983). Die deutschen Kriegsschiffe 1815–1945: Band 2: Torpedoboote, Zerstörer, Schnellboote, Minensuchboote, Minenräumboote (in German). Koblenz: Bernard & Graef Verlag. ISBN 3-7637-4801-6.
- Gröner, Erich; Jung, Dieter; Maass, Martin (1990). German Warships 1915–1945: Volume One: Major Surface Vessels. Annapolis, Maryland, US: Naval Institute Press. ISBN 0-87021-790-9.
- Stoelzel, Albert (1930). Ehrenrangliste der Kaiserlich Deutschen Marine 1914–1918 (in German). Berlin: Thormann & Goetsch.
