= SMS V186 =

Imperial German torpedo boat

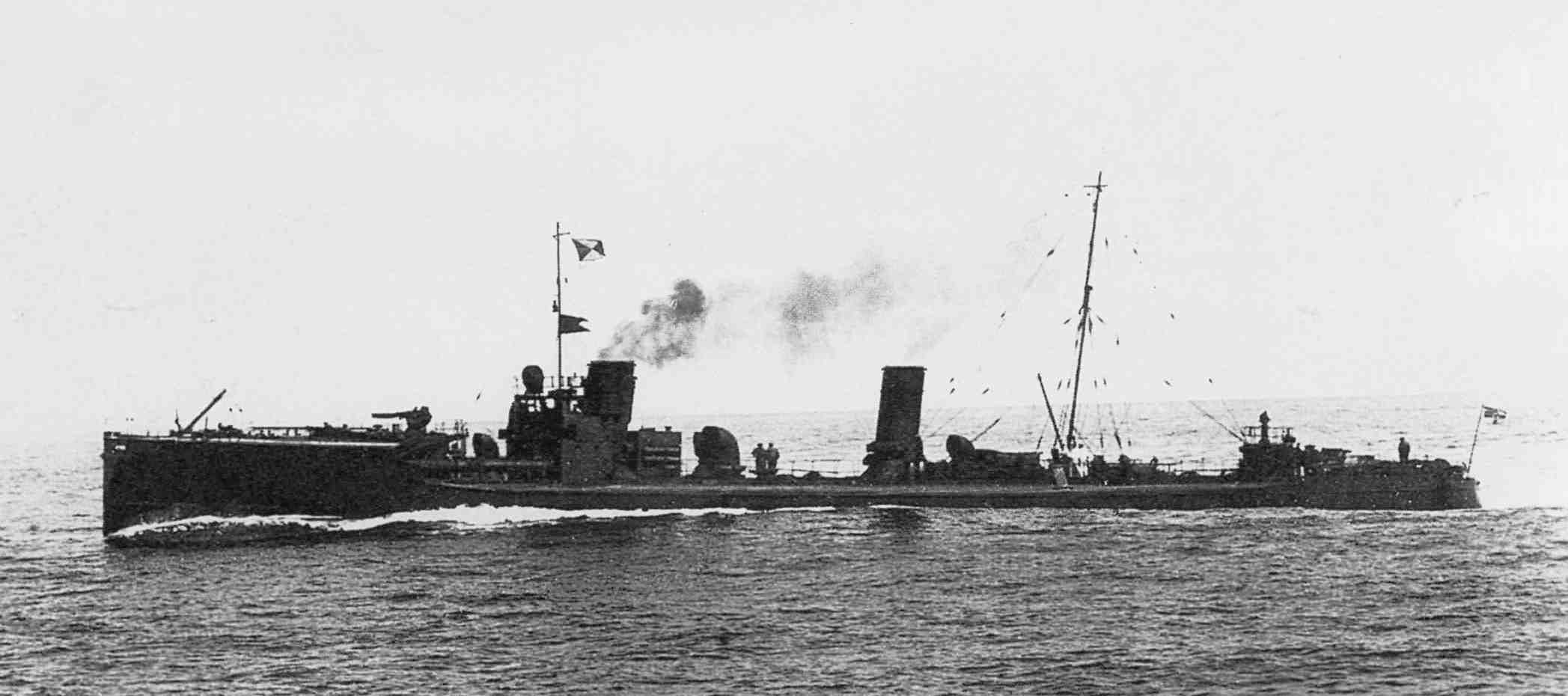

History

German Empire
- Name: SMS V186
- Builder: AG Vulcan, Stettin
- Launched: 28 November 1910
- Completed: 20 April 1911
- Fate: Scrapped 1922

General characteristics
- Class & type: S138-class torpedo boat
- Displacement: 650 t (640 long tons) design
- Length: 73.9 m (242 ft 5 in) o/a
- Beam: 7.9 m (25 ft 11 in)
- Draught: 3.1 m (10 ft 2 in)
- Installed power: 18,000 PS (18,000 shp; 13,000 kW)
- Propulsion: 3 × boilers; 2 × steam turbines
- Speed: 32 kn (37 mph; 59 km/h)
- Complement: 84
- Armament: 2× 8.8 cm guns; 4× 50 cm torpedo tubes

SMS V186 (Note: "SMS" stands for "Seiner Majestät Schiff" (transl. His Majesty's Ship)) (Note: The "V" in V186 denoted the shipbuilder who constructed her, in this case AG Vulcan.) was a S-138-class large torpedo boat of the Imperial German Navy. She was built by the AG Vulcan shipyard at Stettin between 1910 and 1911 and launched on 8 February 1911.

V186 took part the First World War, being renamed T186 in February 1918. She survived the war and was scrapped in 1922.

== Construction and design ==
The Imperial German Navy ordered 12 large torpedo boats (Große Torpedoboote) as part of the fiscal year 1910 shipbuilding programme, with one half-flotilla of six ships (V186–V191) ordered from AG Vulcan and the other six ships from Germaniawerft. The two groups of torpedo boats were of basically similar layout but differed slightly in detailed design, with a gradual evolution of design and increase in displacement with each year's orders.

V186 was 73.9 metres (242 ft 5 in) long overall and 73.6 metres (241 ft 6 in) between perpendiculars, with a beam of 7.9 metres (25 ft 11 in) and a draught of 3.1 metres (10 ft 2 in). The ship displaced 666 tonnes (655 long tons) design and 775 tonnes (763 long tons) deep load.

Three coal-fired and one oil-fired water-tube boiler fed steam at a pressure of 18.5 standard atmospheres (272 psi) to two sets of direct-drive steam turbines. The ship's machinery was rated at 18,000 PS (18,000 shp; 13,000 kW) giving a design speed of 32 knots (37 mph; 59 km/h), with members of the class reaching a speed of 33.5 knots (38.6 mph; 62.0 km/h) during sea trials. 136 tons of coal and 67 tons of oil fuel were carried, giving an endurance of 2,360 nautical miles (2,720 mi; 4,370 km) at 12 knots (14 mph; 22 km/h), 1,250 nautical miles (1,440 mi; 2,320 km) at 17 knots (20 mph; 31 km/h) or 480 nautical miles (550 mi; 890 km) at 30 knots (35 mph; 56 km/h).

The ship was armed with two 8.8 cm L/45 guns, (Note: Both Conway's All The World's Fighting Ships and Jane's Fighting Ships claim L/30 guns were fitted.) one on the forecastle and one aft. Four single 50 cm (19.7 in) torpedo tubes were fitted, with two on the ship's beam in the gap between the forecastle and the ship's bridge which were capable of firing straight ahead, one between the ship's two funnels, and one aft of the funnels. The ship had a crew of 84 officers and men.

V186 was laid down at AG Vulcan's Stettin shipyard as Yard number 304 and was launched on 28 November 1910 and completed on 20 April 1911, as the first of the 1910 torpedo boats to complete.

== Service ==
At the outbreak of the First World War, V186 was based in the Baltic Sea as part of the Baltic Coast Defence Division. In September 1914, V186 and the torpedo boat V26 were transferred to the High Seas Fleet, being replaced in the Baltic by six torpedo boats (G132–G136). On 26 July 1915, the 1st Torpedo boat Half-flotilla, including V186 was escorting minesweepers when the British submarine E16 spotted the torpedo boats and torpedoed V188, blowing off the torpedo boat's stern and sinking her. A torpedo was also fired at V186, which took evasive action and retaliated with a torpedo of her own fired at the submarine's wake. E16 was, however, unharmed. V186, leader of the 1st half-flotilla of I torpedo Boat Flotilla, was again present in the Baltic in December 1915, and attempted rescue operations when the light cruiser Bremen and torpedo boat V191 were sunk in a Russian minefield on 17 December.

V186, part of VII Flotilla, was part of High Seas Fleet when it sailed to cover the Lowestoft Raid on 24–25 April 1916. On 31 May 1916 V186 sortied with the High Seas Fleet as part of VII Flotilla, in the operation that would result in the Battle of Jutland. She was suffering from condenser leaks, however, and was sent back to port on the morning of 31 May, well before the battle started.

V186 served as part of the 16th half-flotilla of VIII Flotilla in the Baltic in 1917, taking part in Operation Albion, the German landings on Ösel in October that year. On 20 October, the British submarine C32 attempted to torpedo the German netlayer Eskimo, but was depth-charged and badly damaged by V186 and S176. The submarine's compass was damaged, and as a result, C32 ran aground the next day and was scuttled.

V186 was renamed T186 on 22 February 1918. She remained part of the 16th half-flotilla of VIII Flotilla at the end of the First World War.

== Fate ==
After the end of the war, as a result of the Treaty of Versailles, T186 was assigned to Britain as a War Reparation, and was scrapped in Dordrecht in 1922.
