= 5.2 cm SK L/55 naval gun =

5.2 cm SK L/55 gun
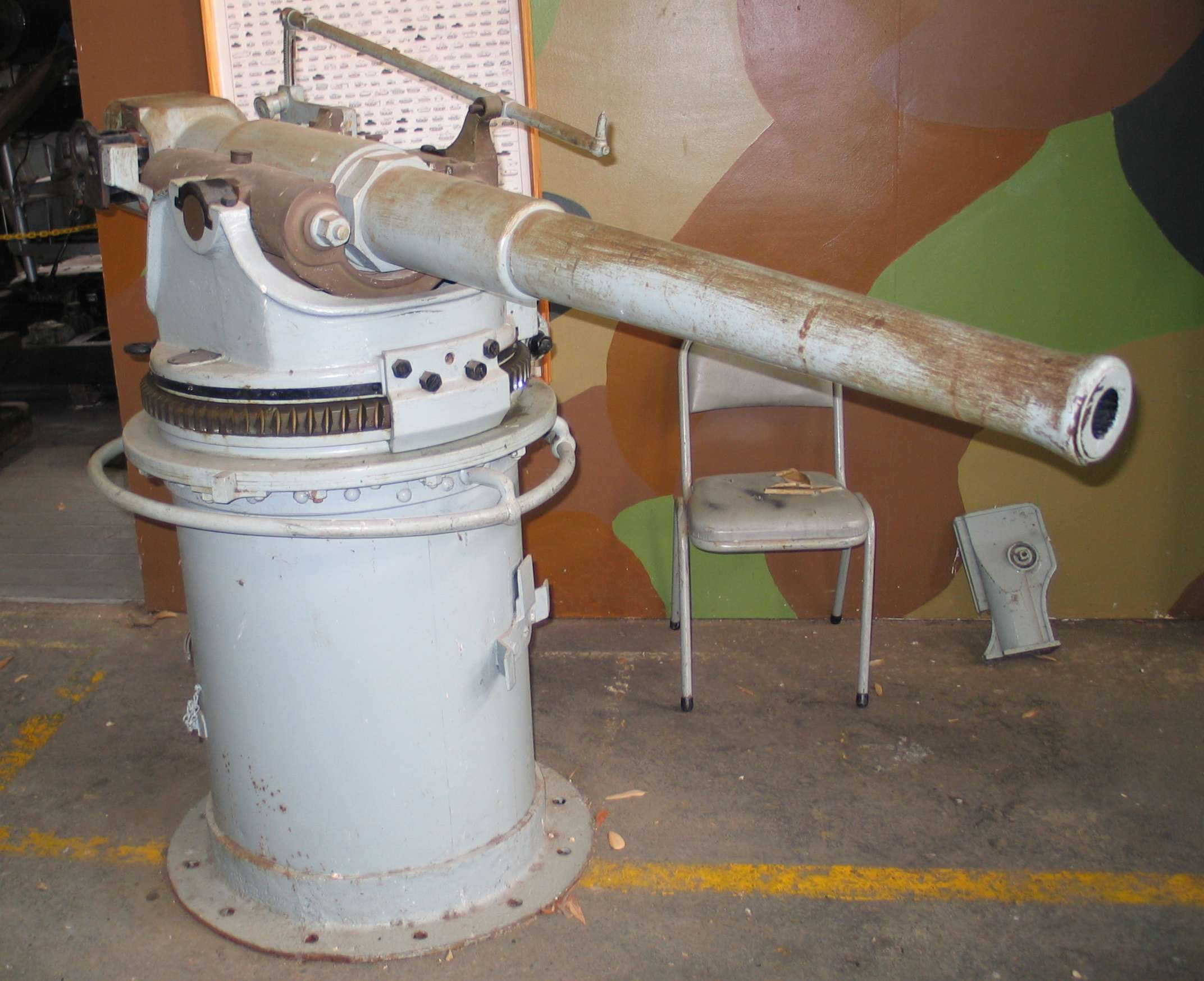
- Krupp gun in Royal Australian Armoured Corps Tank Museum, Puckapunyal, Victoria, Australia.
- Type: Naval gun
- Place of origin: German Empire

Service history
- In service: 1906−1920?
- Used by: German Empire
- Wars: World War I

Production history
- Designed: c. 1905

Specifications
- Mass: 386 kg (851 lb)
- Barrel length: 2.87 m (9 ft 5 in) L/55
- Shell: Fixed QF 52 x 463 R
- Shell weight: 1.75 kg (3 lb 14 oz)
- Caliber: 5.2 cm (2 in)
- Action: Semi-automatic
- Breech: Horizontal sliding wedge
- Recoil: Hydro-pneumatic
- Carriage: Central pivot
- Elevation: -5° to +20°
- Traverse: 360°
- Rate of fire: 10 rpm
- Muzzle velocity: 850 m/s (2,800 ft/s)
- Effective firing range: 7.1 km (4.4 mi) at +20°

The 5.28 cm SK L/55 (Note: SK - Schnelladekanone (quick loading cannon); L - Länge (length); /55 - with a 55-caliber-long barrel) was a German naval gun that was used before and during World War I on a variety of mounts, in torpedo boats and cruisers.

== Design and description ==
The 5.2 cm SK L/55 gun was designed around 1905, and used fixed ammunition. It had an overall length of about 2.86 m (9 ft 5 in). The gun was of built-up steel construction with a central rifled tube, reinforcing hoops from the trunnions to the breech. The gun used a semi-automatic Krupp horizontal sliding-block breech and used fixed quick fire ammunition.

== Service ==
This gun was installed in several torpedo boats and cruisers of the Imperial German Navy, as well as in some torpedo boats ordered by the Royal Netherlands Navy, among them:

- SMS V106 torpedo boat (ex-Dutch)
- A-class torpedo boat (coastal)
- S90-class torpedo boats
- Dresden-class cruisers
- Kolberg-class cruisers
- Königsberg-class cruisers
- Pillau-class cruisers
- Wiesbaden-class cruisers

During World War I it was sometimes replaced with larger guns (as the 8.8 cm L/30, 8.8 cm L/35 or 8.8 cm L/45), while in turn replaced the less powerful 5 cm SK L/40 gun in some older torpedo boats.

== See also ==
- List of naval guns

The gun must have been used during WW2 too, since the Polte factory in Magdeburg, manufactured cartridge cases for this gun, at least august 1942.
