= 8.8 cm SK L/35 naval gun =

8.8 cm SK L/35
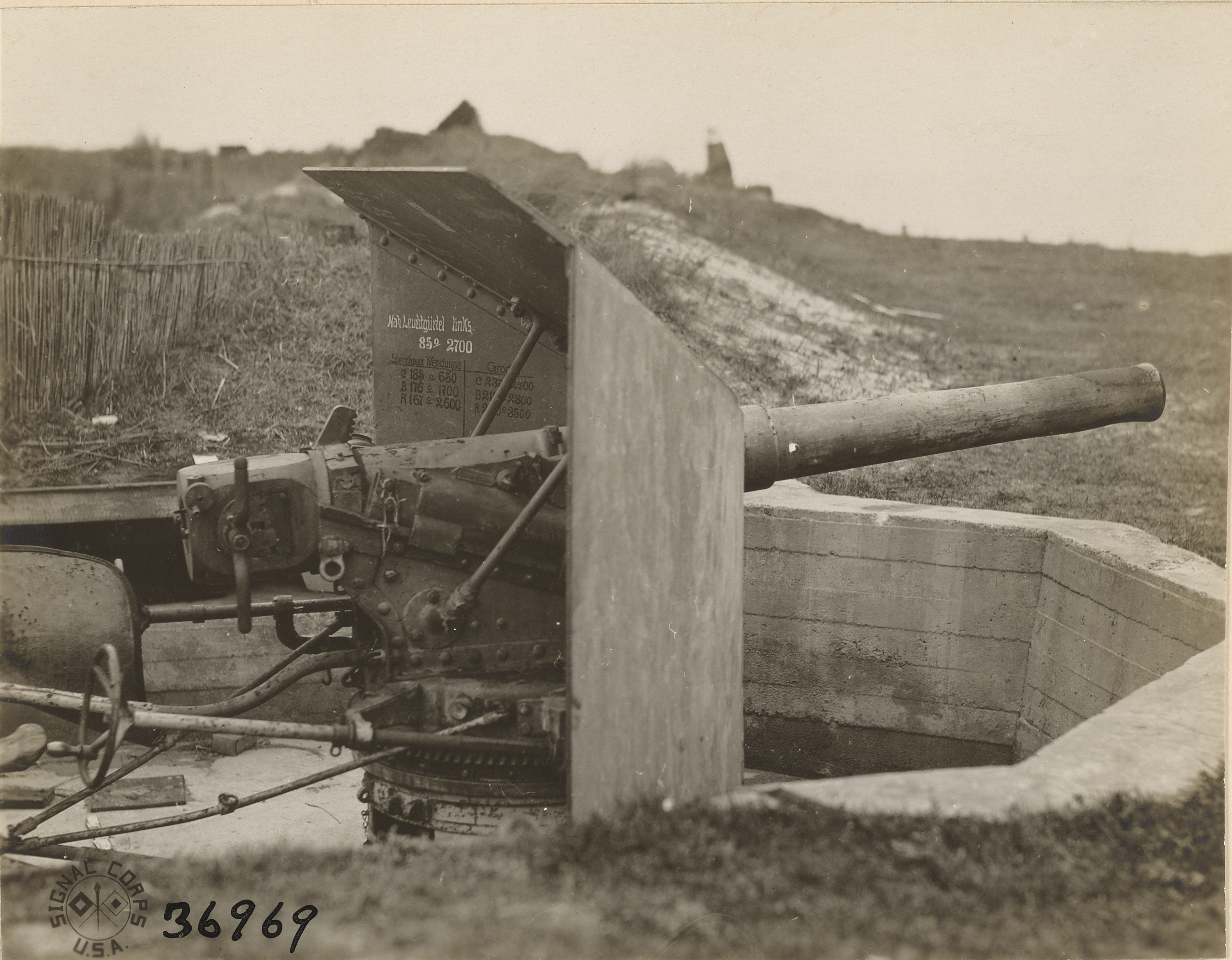
- Type: Naval gun
- Place of origin: German Empire

Service history
- In service: 1904−45
- Used by: German Empire; Nazi Germany
- Wars: World War I World War II

Production history
- Designed: 1900–04

Specifications
- Length: about 3.08 meters (10 ft 1 in)
- Shell: Fixed
- Shell weight: 9.65–9.8 kilograms (21.3–21.6 lb)
- Caliber: 88 millimeters (3.46 in)
- Breech: horizontal sliding-wedge
- Rate of fire: 12 RPM
- Muzzle velocity: 620 m/s (2,000 ft/s)
- Maximum firing range: 8,790 metres (9,610 yd) at 25°

The 8.8 cm SK L/35 (SK - Schnelladekanone (quick loading cannon) L - Länge (with a 35-caliber barrel) was a German naval gun that was used in World War I on a variety of mounts.

== Description ==
The 8.8 cm SK L/35 gun had an overall length of about 3.08 m (10 ft 1 in). It used the Krupp horizontal sliding block, or "wedge", as it is sometimes referred to, breech design.

== Naval service ==
The 8.8 cm SK L/35 was a widely used naval gun on many classes of World War I battleships, cruisers and torpedo boats in both casemates and turrets. Its primary use on battleships and cruisers was as an anti-torpedo boat gun, while on torpedo boats it was their secondary armament.

Ship classes that carried the 8.8 cm SK L/35 include:

- Braunschweig class
- Deutschland class
- Prinz Adalbert class
- Roon class
- S138 class
- S90 class
- Scharnhorst class
- Victoria Louise class

== See also ==
- List of naval guns
