= List of armored cruisers of Germany =

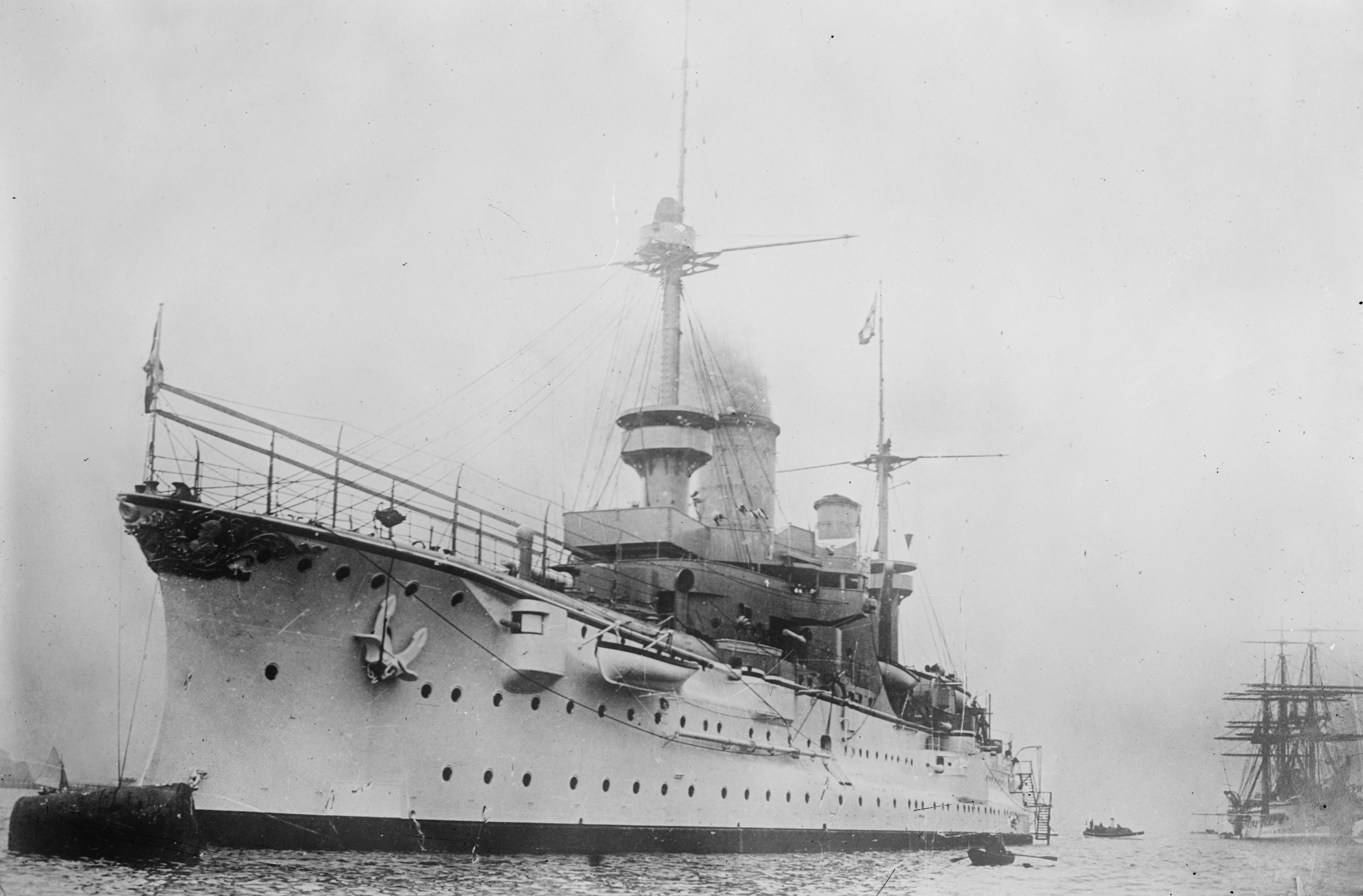
Fürst Bismarck, Germany's first armored cruiser, during a goodwill visit to the United States.

In the late 19th century, the German Imperial Navy (Kaiserliche Marine) experimented with a variety of cruiser types, including small avisos and larger protected cruisers. Due to budget constraints, the navy was unable to build cruisers designed solely for fleet service or for overseas duties. As a result, the naval construction department attempted to design vessels that could fulfill both roles. The protected cruisers, the first of which were the two Irene-class vessels, were laid down starting in 1886. The protected cruisers evolved into more powerful vessels, culminating in Fürst Bismarck, Germany's first armored cruiser. Fürst Bismarck was laid down in 1896, a decade after the first German protected cruiser. (Note: German armored cruisers were known as Panzerkreuzer or Grosse Kreuzer, "armored cruiser" and "large cruiser", respectively. See Grießmer, pp. 8–10.)

Fürst Bismarck proved to be "ideally suited" to overseas duties and formed the basis for subsequent armored cruiser designs. Prinz Heinrich followed in 1898 and incorporated several alterations, including a reduced primary armament, a thinner but more comprehensive armor system, and a higher top speed. The two Prinz Adalbert-class vessels, laid down in 1900 and 1901, were designed with incremental improvements over Prinz Heinrich. Roon and Yorck, two sister ships laid down in 1902 and 1903, respectively, were similar to the two Prinz Adalbert-class cruisers and incorporated only minor improvements. The two Scharnhorst-class armored cruisers, laid down in 1904 and 1905, were marked improvements over the previous designs; they carried a much heavier armament and were more than 2 knots (3.7 km/h; 2.3 mph) faster than the earlier vessels. The last German armored cruiser, Blücher, bridged the development of larger, more powerful battlecruisers. The ship was significantly larger, better armed, and faster than the Scharnhorst class, though she remained inferior to the new Invincible-class battlecruisers then being built by the British Royal Navy.

German armored cruisers followed the pattern set by the corresponding battleships; as compared to foreign equivalents, German warships mounted smaller main battery guns, but a heavier secondary battery. This armament has been compared unfavorably against their British and other counterparts. Naval historian David Lyon remarked that the armored cruisers built by Germany were the "worst designed and least battle-worthy ships" in the navy. Conversely, the German battlecruisers, into which the armored cruiser evolved, were very highly regarded; naval historian John Campbell stated that Von der Tann was "a considerably better fighting ship than any of the 6 British 12 in gun battlecruisers."

Key
Armament	The number and type of the primary armament
Armor	The maximum thickness of the armored belt
Displacement	Ship displacement at full combat load (Note: Historian Erich Gröner states that full load was defined as "[equal to] type displacement plus full load fuel oil, diesel oil, coal, reserve boiler feed water, aircraft fuel, and special equipment." See Gröner, p. ix.)
Propulsion	Number of shafts, type of propulsion system, and top speed generated
Cost	Cost of the ship's construction
Service	The dates work began and finished on the ship and its ultimate fate
Laid down	The date the keel began to be assembled
Commissioned	The date the ship was commissioned

== SMS Fürst Bismarck ==
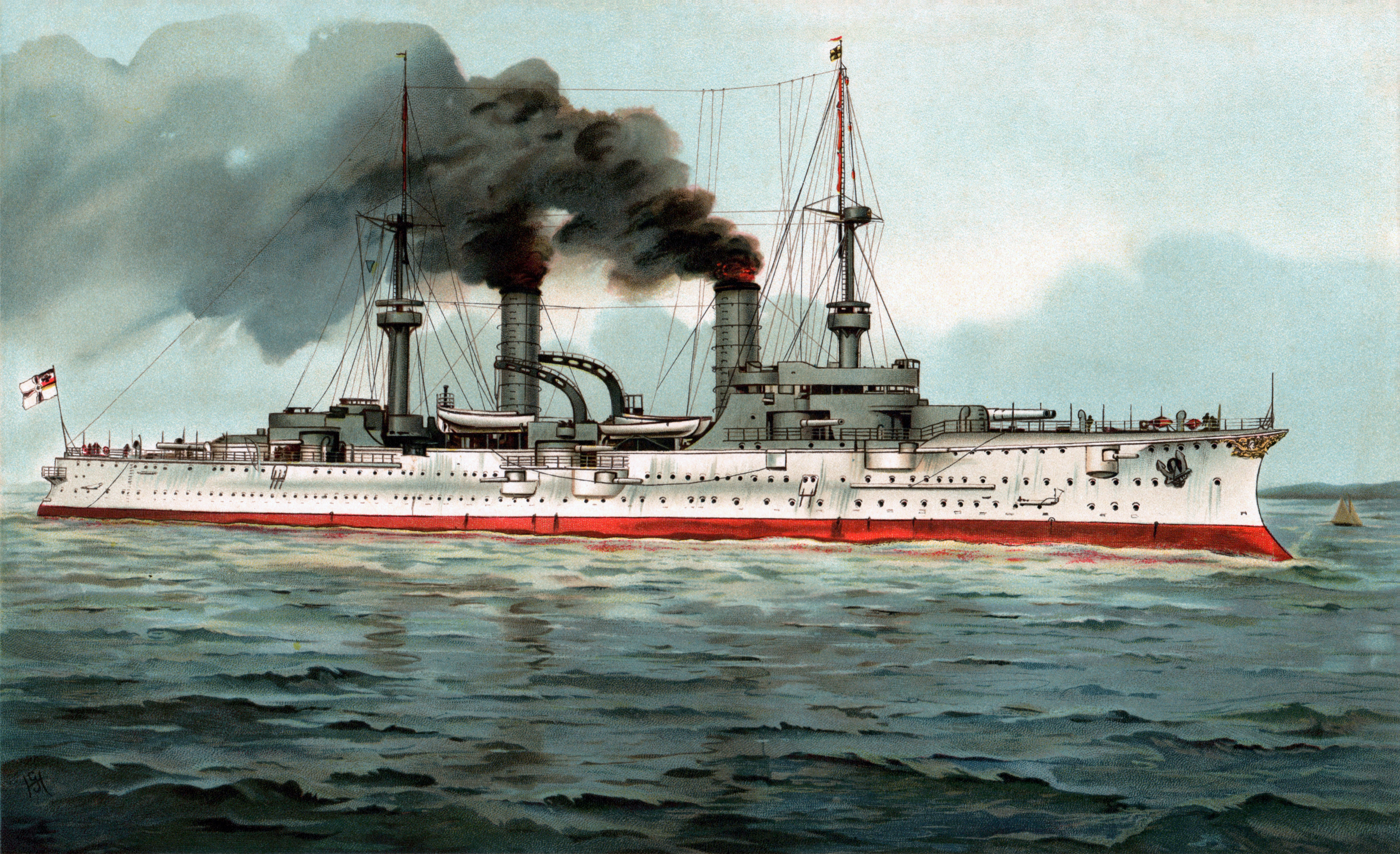
A 1902 lithograph of Fürst Bismarck

Fürst Bismarck was the first armored cruiser constructed for the Imperial Navy. The ship was the only member of its class, and was designed primarily to serve in Germany's colonial fleet. The design for Fürst Bismarck was an improvement over the previous Victoria Louise-class protected cruiser—Fürst Bismarck was significantly larger and better armed than her predecessors. She was equipped with four 24-centimeter (9.4 in) guns mounted in twin gun turrets fore and aft, and with twelve 15 cm (5.9 in) casemated guns as secondary armament. Fürst Bismarck was fitted with Krupp armor; the ship's main armor belt was up to 20 cm (7.9 in) thick over the vessel's machinery spaces, and the deck was armored to a thickness of 3 to 5 cm (1.2 to 2.0 in).

Assigned to the East Asia Squadron, Fürst Bismarck assisted in suppressing the Boxer Uprising before being replaced in 1909 by SMS Scharnhorst. Modernized upon arriving in Germany, she acted in a coast-defense role early in World War I, but was soon relegated to service as a stationary training ship. Following the war, Fürst Bismarck was scrapped in 1919–1920.

Summary of the Fürst Bismarck class
Ship	Armament	Armor	Displacement	Propulsion	Cost	Service		
Ship	Armament	Armor	Displacement	Propulsion	Cost	Laid down	Commissioned	Fate
SMS Fürst Bismarck	4 × 24 cm (9.4 in) SK L/40; 12 × 15 cm (5.9 in) SK L/40 guns	20 cm (7.9 in)	11,461 t (11,280 long tons)	3 screws, triple expansion engines, 18.7 kn (34.6 km/h; 21.5 mph)	18,945,000 marks	1896	1 April 1900	Broken up for scrap in 1919–1920

== SMS Prinz Heinrich ==
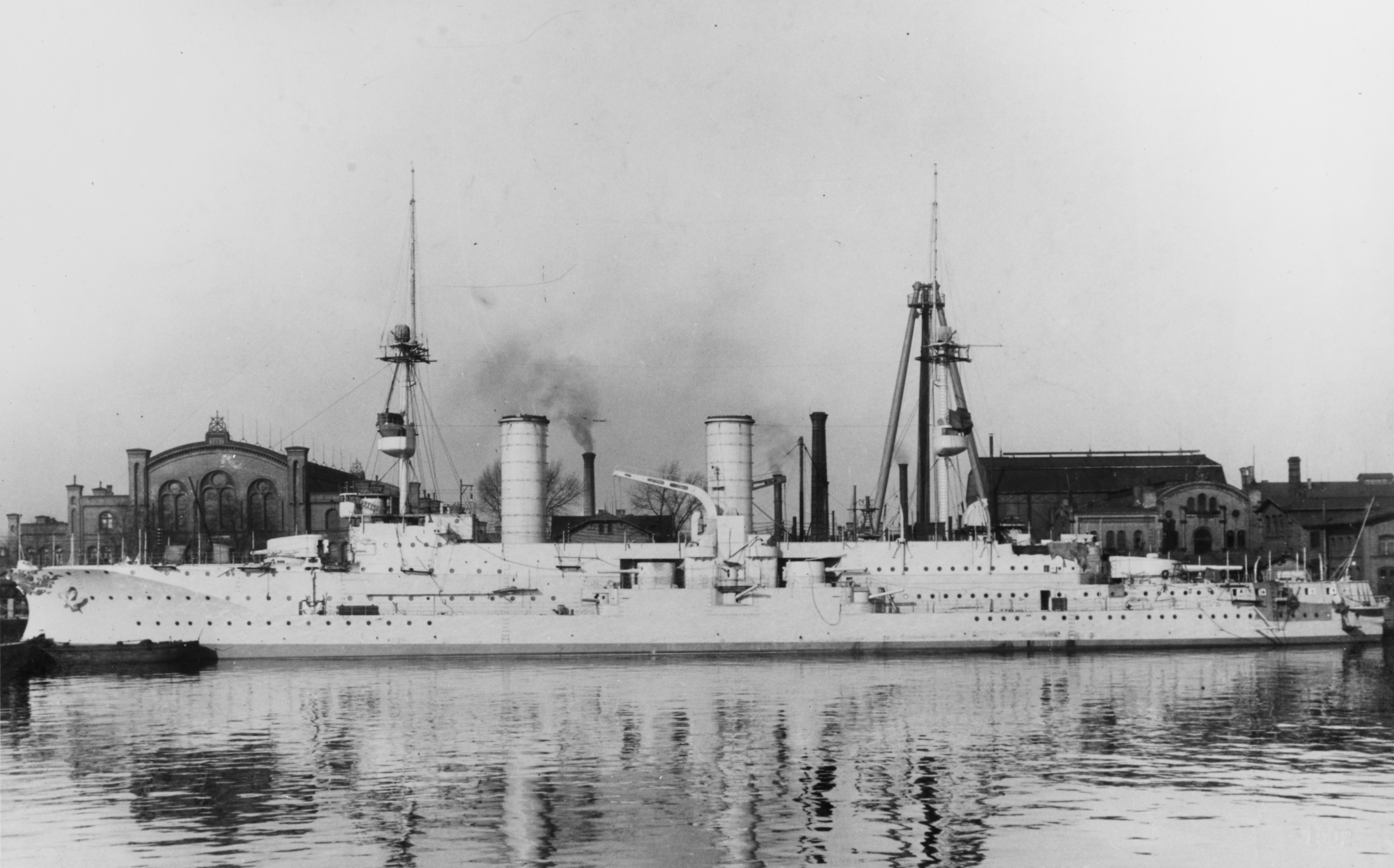
Prinz Heinrich in port, probably while fitting out

SMS Prinz Heinrich was built at the Imperial Dockyard in Kiel. She was laid down in 1898 and completed in March 1902 at a cost of 16,588,000 Marks. Prinz Heinrich's design was a modification of Fürst Bismarck, and traded a smaller main battery for higher speed and more comprehensive armor protection. The ship set a precedent for subsequent German armored cruisers by concentrating her secondary armament amidships, as opposed to Fürst Bismarck, which spread the secondary armament along the length of the ship.

Prinz Heinrich served with the German fleet for the majority of her career. After the outbreak of World War I in August 1914, the ship participated in an operation against the British coast in December 1914, after which she was transferred to the Baltic Sea. Here, she operated against the Russian navy and was involved in the Battle of the Gulf of Riga in August 1915, where she damaged a Russian destroyer. In 1916, the ship was withdrawn from active duty and was used in several secondary roles in Kiel, including acting as a floating office for naval staff. Prinz Heinrich was ultimately sold in 1920 and broken up for scrap later that year.

Summary of the Prinz Heinrich class
Ship	Armament	Armor	Displacement	Propulsion	Cost	Service		
Ship	Armament	Armor	Displacement	Propulsion	Cost	Laid down	Commissioned	Fate
SMS Prinz Heinrich	2 × 24 cm (9.4 in) SK L/40; 10 × 15 cm (5.9 in) SK L/40 guns	10 cm (3.9 in)	9,806 t (9,651 long tons)	3 screws, triple expansion engines, 19.9 kn (36.9 km/h; 22.9 mph)	16,588,000 marks	1898	11 March 1902	Broken up for scrap in 1920

== Prinz Adalbert class ==
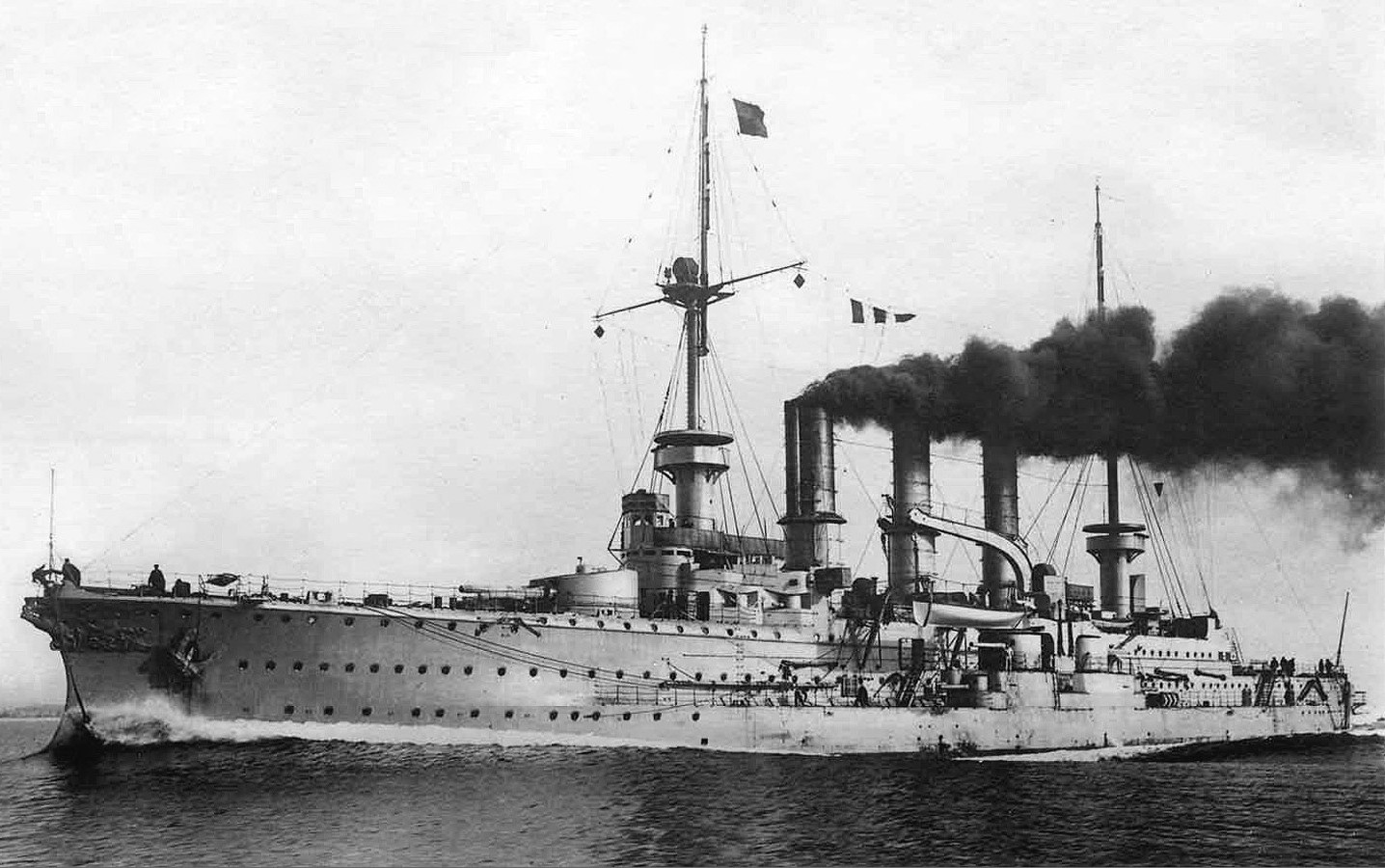
Prinz Adalbert

The Prinz Adalbert class comprised two ships, Prinz Adalbert and Friedrich Carl. Friedrich Carl was commissioned first, on 12 December 1903, and Prinz Adalbert followed on 12 January 1904. They were an improvement on the design of the previous armored cruiser, Prinz Heinrich. Their armor belts were the same thickness but were more extensive than that of their predecessor. The two ships were armed with four main guns in twin gun turrets, as opposed to the two single gun turrets of Prinz Heinrich.

Both ships saw extensive service with the German Navy; Prinz Adalbert was used as a gunnery training ship for her entire peacetime career, while Friedrich Carl served with the fleet until 1909, when she was withdrawn to act as a torpedo training vessel. At the outbreak of World War I in August 1914, both vessels were mobilized and assigned to the cruiser squadron in the Baltic. Friedrich Carl was sunk by Russian naval mines off Memel in November 1914, though most of her crew was safely evacuated. Prinz Adalbert was torpedoed twice by British submarines operating in the Baltic; the first, on 1 July 1915, caused serious damage that was ultimately repaired. The second, on 23 October 1915, caused a catastrophic explosion in the ship's ammunition magazines that destroyed the vessel. Six hundred and seventy-two men were killed, the greatest single loss of life for the German Navy in the Baltic during the war.

Summary of the Prinz Adalbert class
Ship	Armament	Armor	Displacement	Propulsion	Cost	Service		
Ship	Armament	Armor	Displacement	Propulsion	Cost	Laid down	Commissioned	Fate
SMS Prinz Adalbert	4 × 21 cm (8.3 in) SK L/40; 10 × 15 cm (5.9 in) SK L/40 guns	10 cm (3.9 in)	9,875 t (9,719 long tons)	3 screws, triple expansion engines, 20.4 kn (37.8 km/h; 23.5 mph), 17,272 ihp	16,371,000 marks	1900	12 January 1904	Sunk on 23 October 1915 by HMS E8
SMS Friedrich Carl	4 × 21 cm (8.3 in) SK L/40; 10 × 15 cm (5.9 in) SK L/40 guns	10 cm (3.9 in)	9,875 t (9,719 long tons)	3 screws, triple expansion engines, 20.5 kn (38.0 km/h; 23.6 mph)	15,665,000 marks	1901	12 December 1903	Sunk on 17 November 1914 by Russian mines

== Roon class ==
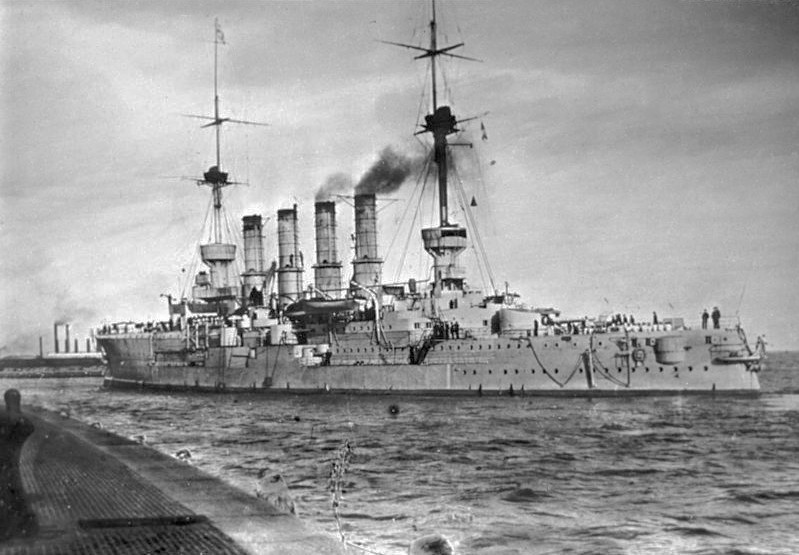
A Roon-class cruiser

The Roon class comprised Roon and Yorck, which closely resembled the earlier Prinz Adalbert-class ships, but incorporated incremental improvements. The ships were easily distinguished from their predecessors by the addition of a fourth funnel. Like all of the armored cruisers built by Germany, they were intended to serve as station ships in Germany's overseas possessions. The ships displaced up to 9,875 metric tons (9,719 long tons) and were armed with a main battery of four 21 cm (8.3 in) guns. Their top speed was 21 kn (39 km/h; 24 mph).

The two ships served with the High Seas Fleet in the reconnaissance squadrons after they joined the fleet in 1905–1906. At the outbreak of World War I in 1914, the ships served alongside the more powerful battlecruisers of the I Scouting Group. While returning to port after a raid of the English coast on 3–4 November 1914, Yorck struck German mines and sank with heavy loss of life. Roon was disarmed in 1916 and intended to be converted into a seaplane carrier, though this was never carried out. The ship was eventually broken up for scrap in 1921.

Summary of the Roon class
Ship	Armament	Armor	Displacement	Propulsion	Cost	Service		
Ship	Armament	Armor	Displacement	Propulsion	Cost	Laid down	Commissioned	Fate
SMS Roon	4 × 21 cm SK L/40; 10 × 15 cm (5.9 in) SK L/40 guns	10 cm (3.9 in)	10,266 t (10,104 long tons)	3 screws, triple expansion engines, 21.1 kn (39.1 km/h; 24.3 mph)	15,345,000 marks	1902	5 April 1906	Broken up for scrap in 1921
SMS Yorck	4 × 21 cm SK L/40; 10 × 15 cm (5.9 in) SK L/40 guns	10 cm (3.9 in)	10,266 t (10,104 long tons)	3 screws, triple expansion engines, 21.4 kn (39.6 km/h; 24.6 mph), 20,031 ihp	16,241,000 marks	1903	21 November 1905	Sunk on 4 November 1914 by German mines

== Scharnhorst class ==
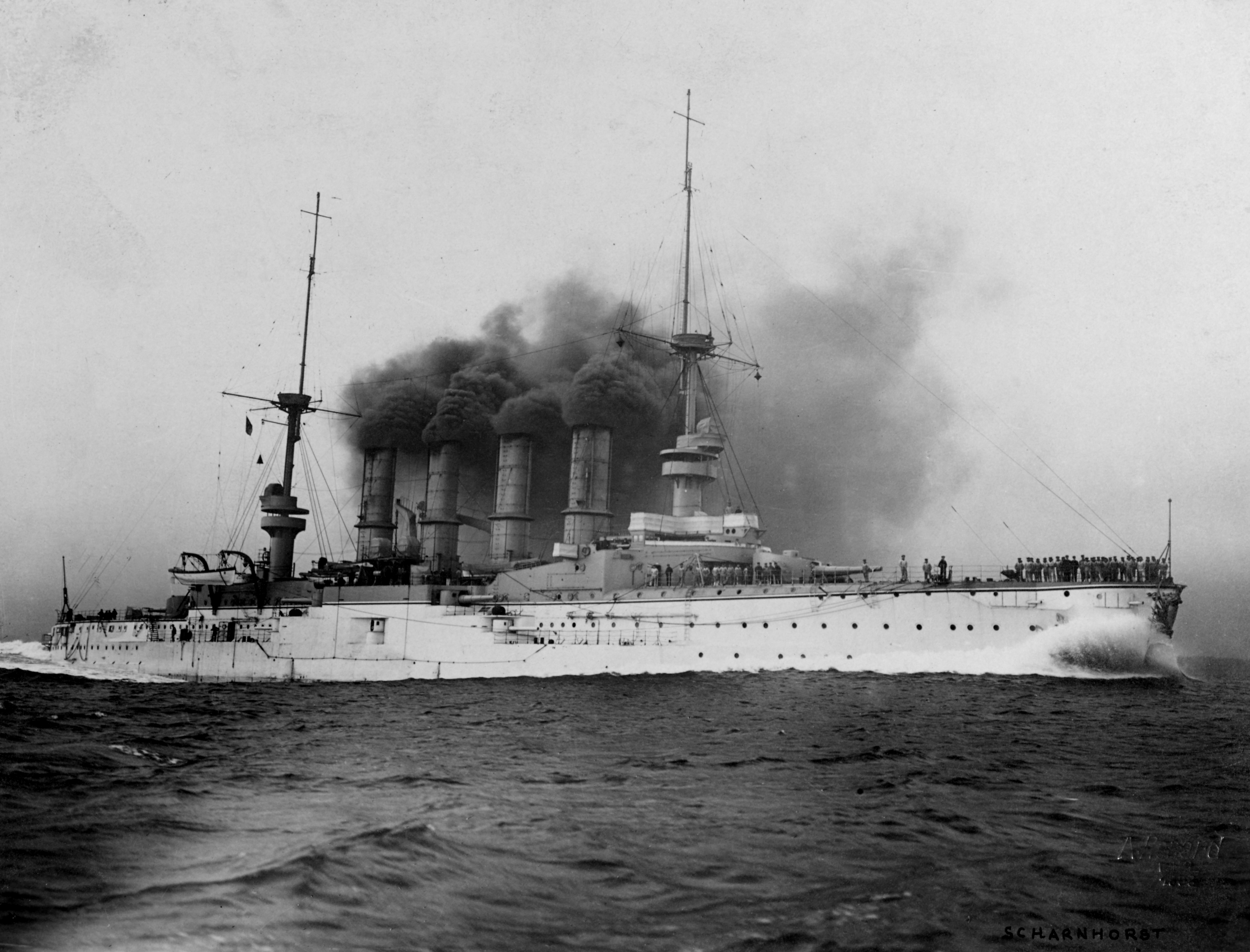
Scharnhorst steaming at top speed

The Scharnhorst class was the last traditional class of armored cruisers built by the Imperial Navy. The class comprised two ships, Scharnhorst and Gneisenau. They were larger than the Roon class that preceded them; the extra size was used primarily to increase the main armament of 21 cm (8.2 inch) guns from four to eight. The ships were the first German cruisers to equal their British counterparts.

Built for overseas service, Scharnhorst and Gneisenau were assigned to the East Asia Squadron in 1909 and 1910, respectively. Both ships had brief careers; shortly before the outbreak of World War I, the ships departed the German colony at Qingdao. On 1 November 1914, the ships destroyed a British force at the Battle of Coronel and inflicted upon the Royal Navy its first defeat since the Battle of Plattsburgh in 1814. The East Asia Squadron, including both Scharnhorst-class ships, was subsequently annihilated at the Battle of the Falkland Islands on 8 December.

Summary of the Scharnhorst class
Ship	Armament	Armor	Displacement	Propulsion	Cost	Service		
Ship	Armament	Armor	Displacement	Propulsion	Cost	Laid down	Commissioned	Fate
SMS Scharnhorst	8 × 21 cm SK L/40; 6 × 15 cm (5.9 in) SK L/40 guns	15 cm (5.9 in)	12,985 t (12,780 long tons)	3 screws, triple expansion engines, 23.5 kn (43.5 km/h; 27.0 mph)	20,319,000 marks	1905	24 October 1907	Sunk on 8 December 1914 at the Battle of the Falkland Islands
SMS Gneisenau	8 × 21 cm (8.3 in) SK L/40; 6 × 15 cm (5.9 in) SK L/40 guns	15 cm (5.9 in)	12,985 t (12,780 long tons)	3 screws, triple expansion engines, 23.6 kn (43.7 km/h; 27.2 mph), 30,396 ihp	19,243,000 marks	1904	6 March 1908	Sunk on 8 December 1914 at the Battle of the Falkland Islands

== SMS Blücher ==
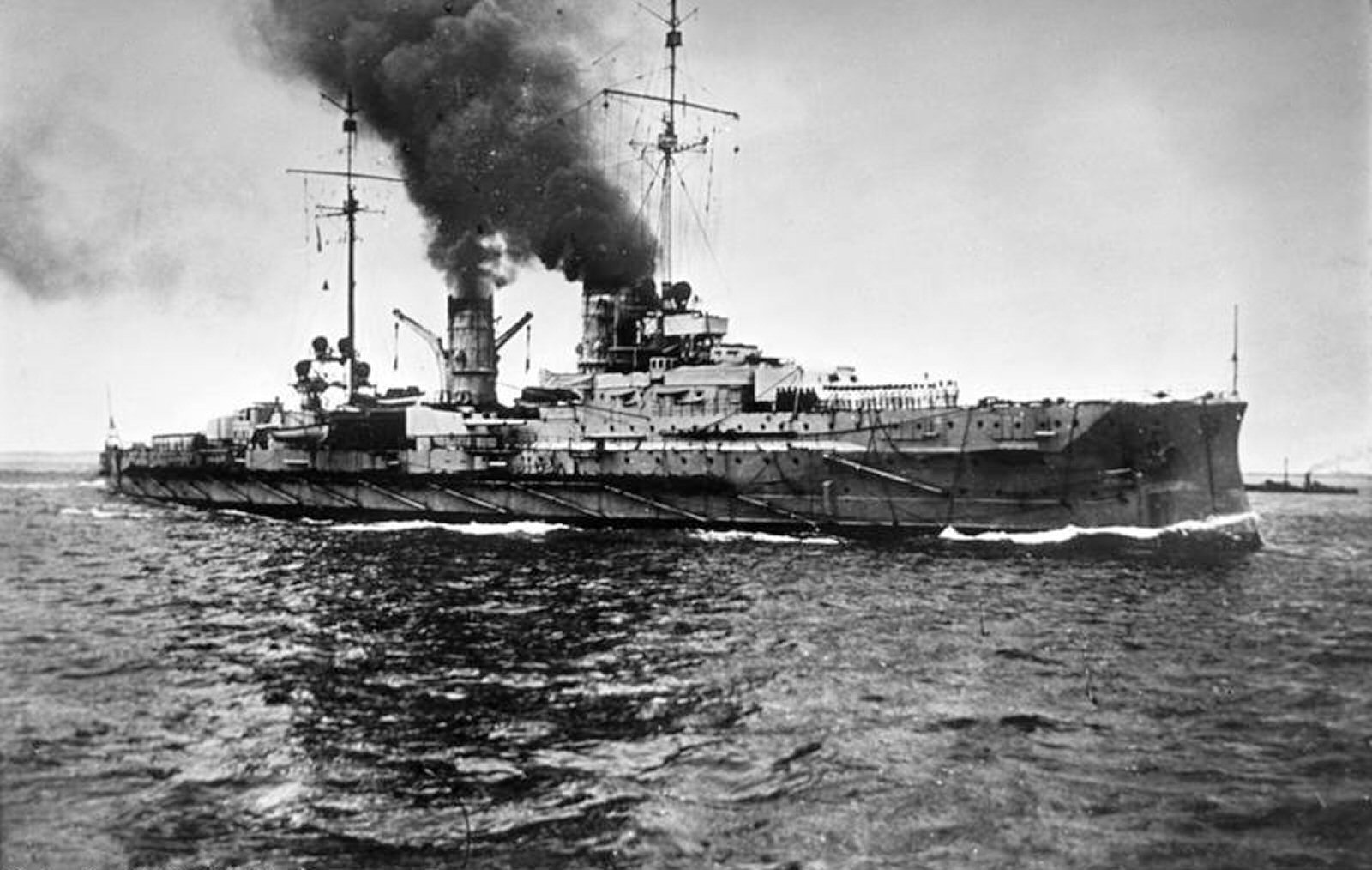
Blücher

SMS Blücher was the last armored cruiser to be built by the Imperial Navy. She was designed to match what German intelligence incorrectly believed to be the specifications of the British Invincible-class battlecruisers. Blücher was larger than preceding armored cruisers and carried more heavy guns, but was unable to match the size and armament of the battlecruisers which replaced armored cruisers in the British and German navies. Her primary armament of twelve 21 cm (8.3 in) guns was greatly inferior to the eight 12 in (300 mm) guns of the British battlecruisers.

The ship initially served as a gunnery training ship, but joined the I Scouting Group after the outbreak of World War I. She took part in the operation to bombard Yarmouth and the raid on Scarborough, Hartlepool and Whitby in 1914. At the Battle of Dogger Bank on 24 January 1915, Blücher was slowed significantly after being hit by gunfire from the British battlecruiser squadron under the command of Vice Admiral Sir David Beatty. Rear Admiral Franz von Hipper, the commander of the German squadron, decided to abandon Blücher to the pursuing enemy ships in order to save his more valuable battlecruisers. Under heavy fire from the British ships, she was sunk with heavy loss of life.

Summary of the Blücher class
Ship	Armament	Armor	Displacement	Propulsion	Cost	Service		
Ship	Armament	Armor	Displacement	Propulsion	Cost	Laid down	Commissioned	Fate
SMS Blücher	12 × 21 cm SK L/45; 8 × 15 cm (5.9 in) SK L/45 guns	18 cm (7.1 in)	17,500 t (17,200 long tons)	3 screws, triple expansion engines, 25.4 kn (47.0 km/h; 29.2 mph)	28,532,000 marks	21 February 1907	1 October 1909	Sunk on 24 January 1915 at the Battle of Dogger Bank
