= 21 cm SK "Peter Adalbert" =

21 cm SK L/40 and SK L/45 "Peter Adalbert"
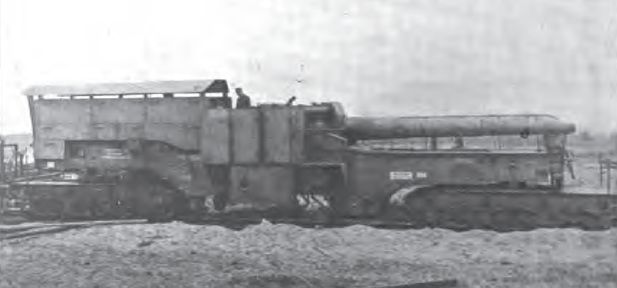
- Type: Railroad gun
- Place of origin: German Empire

Service history
- In service: 1916–18
- Used by: German Empire
- Wars: World War I

Production history
- Designer: Krupp
- Designed: 1915–16
- Manufacturer: Krupp
- Produced: 1916–17
- No. built: 11
- Variants: 21 cm SK L/40; 21 cm SK L/45

Specifications
- Mass: 110.44 tonnes (108.70 long tons; 121.74 short tons) (SK L/40 in Bettungsschiessgerüst); 104.66 tonnes (103.01 long tons; 115.37 short tons) (SK L/45 in Bettungsschiessgerüst)
- Length: 15.85 metres (52 ft 0 in) (E. u. B.)
- Barrel length: about 8.4 metres (27 ft 7 in) SK L/40 about 9.45 metres (31 ft 0 in) SK L/45
- Shell: separate-loading, cased charge
- Caliber: 209.3 millimetres (8.24 in)
- Breech: horizontal sliding-wedge
- Recoil: hydro-spring
- Carriage: 2 x 4-axle trucks
- Elevation: +0° to 45°
- Traverse: 2° 15' (E. u. B.); 85° (Bettungsschiessgerüst); 180° on platform
- Muzzle velocity: 770 to 790 m/s (2,500 to 2,600 ft/s)
- Maximum firing range: 25,580 to 26,400 metres (27,970 to 28,870 yd)

The 21 cm SK "Peter Adalbert" (SK - Schnelladekanone (quick-loading cannon) was a German railway gun used during World War I. It served on the Western Front and in Gallipoli between 1916 and 1918. Eleven were built, using two different surplus naval guns that shared the same mount. Only four are known to have survived destruction after the end of the war.

== Design ==
The loss of the armored cruiser Blücher during the Battle of Dogger Bank in January 1915 rendered its four reserve 21 cm SK L/45 C/06 guns surplus as no other ships used them. An order was placed with Krupp to design a Bettungsschiessgerüst (firing platform) in May 1915 that could use the redundant guns. They were portable mounts that could be emplaced anywhere after several weeks of labor to prepare the position. It rotated on a pivot at the front of the mount and the rear was supported by rollers resting on a semicircular rail and was generally equipped with a gun shield. One obvious change made for land service was the placement of a small counterweight just forward of the trunnions to counteract the preponderance of weight towards the breech. This, although heavy, was simpler than adding equilibrators to perform the same function.

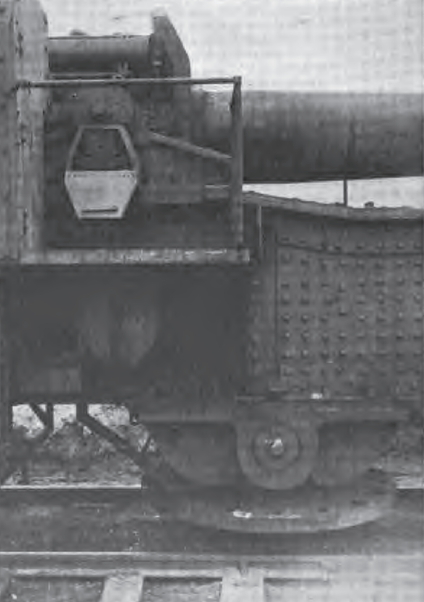
Close up of the pintle under a "Peter Adalbert" E. u. B. mount

The early loss of three out of four armored cruisers of the Prinz Adalbert and Roon classes to mines and submarines made their reserve guns available as well. They used the older 21 cm SK L/40 C/01 gun of lesser performance, but it could be adapted to use the same mount as the newer guns despite being heavier and with a shorter barrel. SMS Roon's guns also became available when she was disarmed in 1916. Serial numbers for four 21 cm SK L/45 C/06 and seven 21 cm SK L/40 C/01 guns have been identified.

The Germans were dissatisfied with the lengthy time required to emplace the Bettungsschiessgerüst and, in 1918, decided to transfer the guns to the Eisenbahn und Bettungsschiessgerüst (E. u. B.) (railroad and firing platform) mounts successfully used by other German railroad guns. Only five guns had been transferred to the new mounts before the end of the war.

The E. u. B. could fire from any suitable section of track after curved wedges were bolted to the track behind each wheel to absorb any residual recoil after the gun cradle recoiled backwards. It also had a pintle built into the underside of the front of the mount. Two large rollers were fitted to the underside of the mount at the rear. Seven cars could carry a portable metal firing platform (Bettungslafette) that had a central pivot mount and an outer rail. It was assembled with the aid of a derrick or crane, which took between three and five days, and railroad tracks were laid slightly past the firing platform to accommodate the front bogies of the gun. The gun was moved over the firing platform and then lowered into position after the central section of rail was removed. After the gun's pintle was bolted to the firing platform's pivot mount, the entire carriage was jacked up so that the trucks and their sections of rail could be removed. The carriage was then lowered so that the rear rollers rested on the outer track. Concrete versions were also used. It could have up to 360° of traverse. The E. u. B. retained 2° 15' of on-mount traverse for fine aiming adjustments.

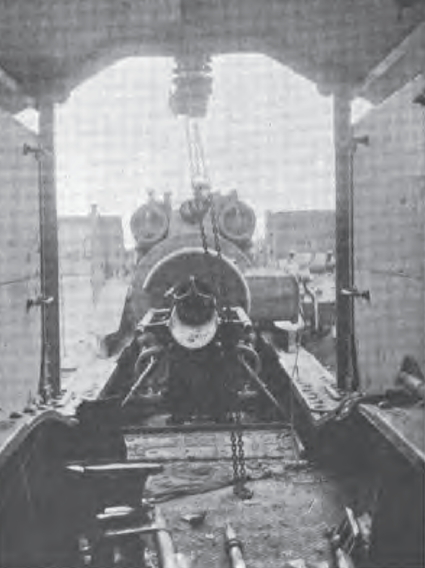
The breech and loading system of a "Peter Adalbert"

Ammunition on the E. u. B. was moved by means of a shot tray provided with two two-man handles, a yoke above with an eye and wheels so that shells could be moved by hand, rolled or carried by the trolley hoist which runs along the overhead rail. An extensible rail could raised and braced in place to reach shells placed on the ground on in an ammunition car behind the mount. The shot tray could be hooked to the breech to hold the powder and shell in place while they were manually rammed. The gun had to be loaded at zero elevation and thus had to be re-aimed after every shot. The "Peter Adalbert" fired several different shells with weights between 113.5 and 115 kilograms (250 and 254 lb). It used the German naval system of ammunition, where the base charge was held in a metallic cartridge case and supplemented by another charge in a silk bag which was rammed first.

== Combat History ==
The Peter Adalbert's baptism of fire came on 21 February 1916 in the Battle of Verdun, when a SK L/45 in Bettungsschiessgerüst opened fire at the beginning of the battle. One SK L/40 in Bettungsschiessgerüst was sent to reinforce the defenses of Gallipoli in 1917 and remained there for the rest of the war under the command of Kommando FR 17. Two SK L/45 and five SK L/40 guns, all in Bettungsschiessgerüst mounts, were produced in 1916. They were organized into batteries, each with one gun. Known designations were 408, 428, 684, 717, 746 and 790. One "Peter Adalbert" in Bettungsschiessgerüst participated in the Battle of the Somme in October 1916. Two "Peter Adalbert" in Bettungsschiessgerüst participated in the Battle of Passchendaele in July 1917 and two were stationed opposite Verdun in August 1917. Seven "Peter Adalbert" guns supported the 1918 German spring offensives, although their mount types are not noted. One bombarded the French during the Second Battle of the Marne. One SK L/45 in E. u. B. gun was captured by the Americans in November 1918 and the French captured an SK L/40 in Bettungsschiessgerüst that same month. Only two guns were destroyed after the Armistice. Four others escaped destruction by the Military Inter-Allied Commission of Control because they were assigned to Batterie Plantagen on coast defense duties at Swinemünde.

== Sources ==
- François, Guy. Eisenbahnartillerie: Histoire de l'artillerie lourd sur voie ferrée allemande des origines à 1945. Paris: Editions Histoire et Fortifications, 2006
- Jäger, Herbert. German Artillery of World War One. Ramsbury, Marlborough, Wiltshire: Crowood Press, 2001 ISBN 1-86126-403-8
- Kosar, Franz. Eisenbahngeschütz der Welt. Stuttgart: Motorbook, 1999 ISBN 3-613-01976-0
- Miller, H. W., Lt. Col. Railway Artillery: A Report on the Characteristics, Scope of Utility, Etc., of Railway Artillery, Volume I Washington: Government Print Office, 1921
- Schmalenbach, Paul (1983). "German Navy Large Bore Guns Operational Ashore During World War I". Warship International. XX (2): 123–153. ISSN 0043-0374.
