= Scharnhorst class =

Scharnhorst class may refer to:

- Scharnhorst-class cruiser - a German ship class of two cruisers active in World War I
- Scharnhorst-class battleship - a German ship class of two capital ships active in World War II
