= 21 cm SK L/45 =

- Type: Naval gun Railway gun Coastal artillery
- Place of origin: German Empire

Service history
- In service: 1909-1945
- Used by: German Empire; Nazi Germany
- Wars: World War I World War II

Production history
- Designer: Krupp
- Designed: 1905
- Manufacturer: Krupp
- No. built: 16
- Variants: 21 cm SK "Peter Adalbert"

Specifications
- Mass: 16.4 t (18.1 short tons)
- Length: 9.4 m (30 ft 10 in)
- Barrel length: 8.8 m (28 ft 10 in)
- Shell: Separate loading cased ammunition
- Shell weight: 108–113.5 kg (238–250 lb)
- Caliber: 210 mm (8.3 in) 45 caliber
- Breech: Horizontal sliding-wedge breech block
- Elevation: -5° to +30°
- Traverse: Forward and aft turrets: -150° to +150° Beam turrets: +30° to +150°
- Rate of fire: 4-6 rpm
- Muzzle velocity: 900 m/s (3,000 ft/s)
- Maximum firing range: Naval: 19 km (12 mi) at +30° Coastal Artillery: 29 km (18 mi) at +45°

The 21 cm Schnelladekanone Länge 45, abbreviated as 21 cm SK L/45 was a German naval gun developed in the years before World War I that armed the armored cruiser SMS Blücher of the Imperial German Navy. During World War I spare guns were converted to railway guns and later employed as coastal artillery during World War II.

== History ==
The 21 cm SK L/45 was the primary armament of the armored cruiser SMS Blücher. Krupp produced a total of sixteen guns, twelve of which were installed in six twin DRL C/06 turrets, one pair fore and one pair aft, and two pairs in wing turrets on either side of the superstructure, each weighing 200 t (220 short tons). The guns were supplied with a total of 1,020 shells, or 85 rounds per gun. After the sinking of the SMS Blücher during the Battle of Dogger Bank, the four spare guns were given to the Imperial German Army. The 21 cm SK L/45s, together with earlier 21 cm SK L/40s salvaged from decommissioned cruisers were converted to railway guns, where they were referred to collectively as the 21 cm SK "Peter Adalbert". During the Second World War, these same guns were reemployed by coastal artillery units of the Wehrmacht. During World War II they were supplied with improved shells and larger propellant charges for increased range.

== Construction ==
The 21 cm SK L/45 was constructed of A tube, two layers of hoops, a jacket and used a horizontal sliding-wedge breech block. Unlike other large naval guns of the time, which used separate loading bagged charges and ammunition, the 21 cm SK L/45 used separate loading ammunition with charges inside of a brass cartridge case to provide obturation.

== Bibliography ==
- Friedman, Norman (2011). Naval Weapons of World War One. Barnsley, South Yorkshire, UK: Seaforth. ISBN 978-1-84832-100-7.
- Gröner, Erich (1990). German Warships: 1815–1945. Annapolis: Naval Institute Press. ISBN 978-0-87021-790-6. OCLC 22101769.
- http://www.navweaps.com/Weapons/WNGER_827-45_skc05.php
