= Roon-class cruiser =

Class of armored cruisers of the German Imperial Navy

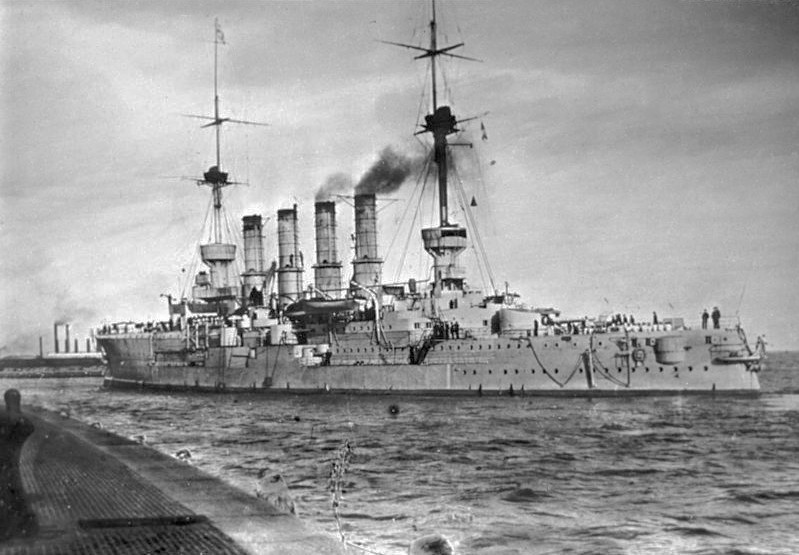
- One of the Roon-class cruisers

Class overview
- Name: Roon
- Builders: Kaiserliche Werft Kiel; Blohm & Voss
- Operators: Imperial German Navy
- Preceded by: Prinz Adalbert class
- Succeeded by: Scharnhorst class
- Built: 1902–1906
- In commission: 1905–1916
- Completed: 2
- Lost: 1
- Scrapped: 1

General characteristics
- Type: Armored cruiser
- Displacement: Normal: 9,533 t (9,382 long tons); Full load: 10,266 t (10,104 long tons)
- Length: 127.8 m (419 ft)
- Beam: 20.2 m (66 ft 3 in)
- Draft: 7.76 m (25 ft 6 in)
- Installed power: 19,000 metric horsepower (14,000 kW); 16 × water-tube boilers
- Propulsion: 3 × screw propellers; 3 × triple-expansion steam engines
- Speed: 21.1 knots (39.1 km/h; 24.3 mph)
- Range: 4,200 nmi (7,800 km; 4,800 mi) at 12 knots (22 km/h; 14 mph)
- Crew: 35 officers; 598 enlisted men
- Armament: 4 × 21 cm (8.3 in) SK L/40 guns; 10 × 15 cm (5.9 in) SK L/40 guns; 14 × 8.8 cm (3.5 in) SK L/35 guns; 4 × 45 cm (17.7 in) torpedo tubes
- Armor: Belt: 8–10 cm (3.1–3.9 in); Turrets: 15 cm (5.9 in); Deck: 40–60 mm (1.6–2.4 in)

The Roon class was a pair of armored cruisers built for the German Kaiserliche Marine (Imperial Navy) in the 1900s. The two ships of the class, Roon and Yorck, closely resembled the earlier Prinz Adalbert-class cruisers upon which they were based. The Roon class incorporated slight incremental improvements, including a pair of extra boilers. The ships were easily distinguishable from their predecessors by the addition of a fourth funnel. Though the additional boilers were meant to increase the ships' speed, both vessels failed to reach their designed top speed. When combined with the Roon class' relatively light armament and thin armor protection, the ships compared poorly with their foreign contemporaries—particularly the armored cruisers of their anticipated opponent, the British Royal Navy.

The two ships served in I Scouting Group, the reconnaissance force of the Heimatflotte (Home Fleet), after they entered service in 1905–1906. During this period, Yorck and Roon served stints as the group flagship and the deputy commander's flagship, respectively. By the early 1910s, the first German battlecruisers had begun to enter service. Roon was therefore decommissioned in 1911 and placed in reserve; Yorck joined her in 1913. Both ships were reactivated in August 1914 after World War I broke out the previous month. They were assigned to III Scouting Group, with Roon as its flagship, and tasked with screening the main body of the German fleet. In November, the German fleet made the raid on Great Yarmouth, but on return to port at Wilhelmshaven the fleet encountered heavy fog and had to stop off Schillig. Yorck's commander decided that visibility had improved so he ordered his ship to get underway again, but she quickly struck two German mines and sank with heavy loss of life.

Roon was transferred to the Baltic in April 1915 and participated in a series of offensive operations against Russian forces, including the attack on Libau in May, the Battle of the Åland Islands in July, and the Battle of the Gulf of Riga in August. The threat of British submarines led to her decommissioning in 1916, after which she was employed as a training ship and an accommodation vessel. Plans to convert her into a seaplane tender late in the war came to nothing owing to Germany's defeat in 1918, and she was stricken from the naval register in 1920 and broken up the following year.

== Design ==
The Second Naval Law in Germany, passed in 1900, envisioned a force of fourteen armored cruisers for service both in Germany's colonial empire and as scouts for the main battle fleet in German waters. (Note: Armored cruisers were vessels that generally possessed side armor intended to serve on foreign stations, as a fast wing of a fleet of battleships, or to attack or protect merchant shipping. Side armor differentiated them from large protected cruisers that only incorporated an armor deck for defense against enemy fire.) The naval expansion program was primarily directed against the British Royal Navy, then the world's preeminent naval force. The previous armored cruiser design, the Prinz Adalbert class, provided the basis for the next pair of vessels to be built under the program. The design for the new ships, completed in 1901, was slightly improved over that of Prinz Adalbert, with the primary changes being the addition of two boilers, which necessitated a longer hull and provided an increase of about 2,000 metric horsepower (1,973 ihp). (Note: The Prinz Adalbert-class cruiser's propulsion system was rated to produce 16,200 metric horsepower (16,000 ihp), so the resulting increase actually amounted to 2,800 PS.) The design staff projected that the ships would gain 0.5 knots (0.93 km/h; 0.58 mph) in speed over the earlier cruisers for a top speed of 22 knots (41 km/h; 25 mph), but in service, neither actually reached that speed. They were nevertheless about a half-knot faster than the Prinz Adalberts, which had also failed to reach their intended speed. These failures were primarily the result of their length-to-breadth ratio, which was imposed by the limitations of existing dock facilities in Wilhelmshaven.

The Roon-class ships shared many layout characteristics with the contemporary German pre-dreadnought battleships, including a smaller main armament but heavier secondary battery than their foreign equivalents. As with all of the preceding German armored cruisers, they received less armor protection than their opposite numbers in the British fleet. As a result, they compared unfavorably with their British contemporaries. The historian John Taylor describes the ships as "poorly protected and not a successful class in service." Further, they suffered the same fate as many pre-dreadnought type vessels completed in the mid-1900s, having been rendered obsolescent by the advent of all-big-gun warships like the British battlecruiser Invincible, launched in 1907. Despite their drawbacks, the Roons provided the basis for the follow-on Scharnhorst class, which proved to be far better fighting ships, more than a match for contemporary British armored cruisers.

=== General characteristics and machinery ===
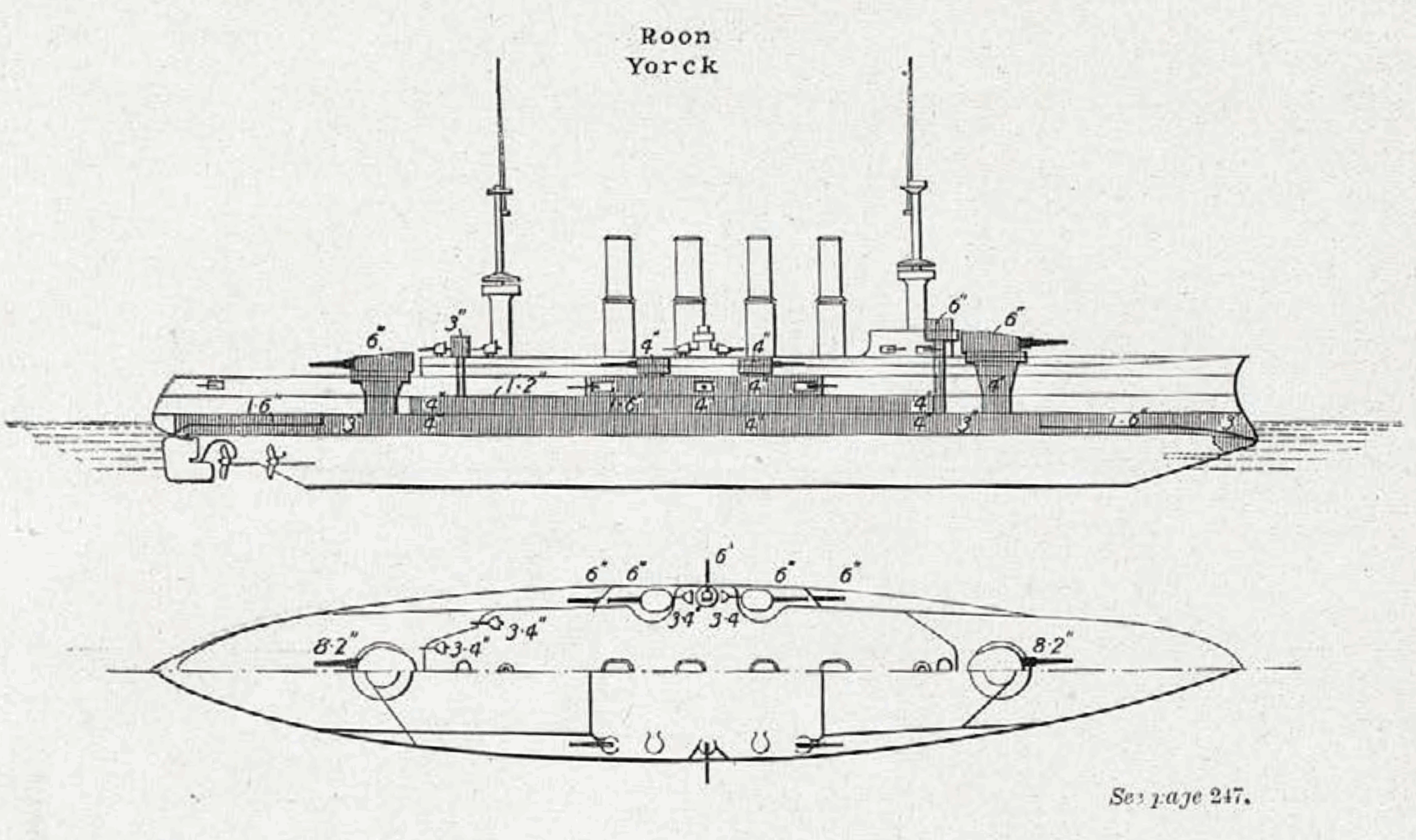
Plan and elevation of the Roon class

The ships of the Roon class were 127.30 meters (417 ft 8 in) long at the waterline and 127.80 m (419 ft 3 in) overall. They had a beam of 20.20 m (66 ft 3 in) and a draft of 7.76 m (25 ft 6 in). Roon and Yorck displaced 9,533 metric tons (9,382 long tons) normally, and 10,266 metric tons (10,104 long tons) at full load. Their hulls were constructed from transverse and longitudinal steel frames that formed a structure over which the steel hull plates were riveted. The hulls contained twelve watertight compartments and a double bottom that ran for sixty percent of the length of the ship.

Like the preceding Prinz Adalbert-class ships, Roon and Yorck were good sea boats; when the fuel bunkers were full they had a gentle motion. They also maneuvered well and were responsive to the helm; steering was controlled with a single rudder. With the rudder turned to its maximum extent, the ships lost up to 60 percent of their speed. The ships' design placed the casemates too low, and as a result they were exceedingly wet, which rendered them impossible to use in heavy seas. The ships had a metacentric height of 1.04 m (3 ft 5 in). Their standard complements numbered some 35 officers and 598 enlisted men. While serving as a squadron flagship, the crew was augmented by 13 officers and 62 men, and as a second command ship by 9 officers and 44 sailors.

Roon and Yorck were powered by the same engine system as the preceding class: three 3-cylinder vertical triple expansion engines, each of which drove a screw propeller. The central screw was 4.50 m (14 ft 9 in) in diameter, and the outer screws were 4.80 m (15 ft 9 in). Steam was provided to the engines by sixteen coal-fired water-tube boilers built by Düsseldorf-Ratinger Röhrenkesselfabrik (Dürr). Each boiler had 4 fireboxes for a total of 64. The boilers were ducted into four funnels. The propulsion system produced 19,000 ihp (14,200 kW), which had a rated top speed of 22 knots (41 km/h), though on trials neither ship reached that figure, with Roon making 21.1 knots (39.1 km/h; 24.3 mph) and Yorck only 20.4 knots (37.8 km/h; 23.5 mph). The ships had four turbo generators for electrical power, which provided 260 kilowatts at 110 volts.

=== Armament and armor ===
The forward turret of Scharnhorst; the Roon-class cruisers carried the same type

The ships' primary armament consisted of four 21-centimeter (8.3 in) SK L/40 guns mounted in two twin-gun turrets, one fore and one aft. (Note: In Imperial German Navy gun nomenclature, "SK" (Schnellfeuerkanone) denotes that the gun is quick loading, while the L/40 denotes the length of the gun. In this case, the L/40 gun is 40 calibers, meaning that the gun is 40 times as long as it is in bore diameter.) The turrets were the C/01 type turrets, which were hydraulically operated, and the mounts provided a range of elevation from −5 to +30 degrees. These guns fired a 108-kilogram (238 lb) armor-piercing shell at a muzzle velocity of 780 meters per second (2,600 ft/s), for a maximum range of 16,200 m (17,700 yd). The Roon-class ships carried 380 shells for the main battery.

The main battery was supported by a secondary battery of ten 15 cm (5.9 in) SK L/40 guns in single turrets and casemates clustered amidships. These guns fired a 40 kg (88 lb) shell at a muzzle velocity of 800 m/s (2,600 ft/s). They could be elevated to 30 degrees, which provided a maximum range of 13,900 m (15,200 yd). For close-range defense against torpedo boats, the ships carried a tertiary battery of fourteen 8.8 cm SK L/35 guns, which were mounted in individual casemates and pivot mounts in the superstructure. The 8.8 cm guns fired a 7 kg (15 lb) shell at a muzzle velocity of 770 m/s (2,500 ft/s). These guns had a maximum elevation of 25 degrees and a range of 9,100 m (10,000 yd). Each ship carried 1,600 rounds for the 15 cm guns, and 2,100 shells for the 8.8 cm guns.

As was customary for warships of the period, the ships were also equipped with torpedo tubes, each carrying four 45 cm (17.7 in) tubes. These tubes were submerged in the hull, one in the bow, one in the stern, and one on each broadside. The C/03 torpedo used carried a 147.5-kilogram (325 lb) warhead and had a range of 1,500 m (4,900 ft) when set at a speed of 31 knots (57 km/h; 36 mph) and 3,000 m (9,800 ft) at 26 knots (48 km/h; 30 mph).

Roon and Yorck were protected by Krupp cemented steel armor. At the waterline, their armored belt was 100 mm (3.9 in) thick amidships where the ships' vitals were located. This was decreased slightly to 80 mm (3.1 in) on either end of the central section of the belt. The belt was backed by 55 mm (2.2 in) of teak planking. At the casemate deck the side armor was also 100 mm thick. The armored deck ranged in thickness from 40–60 mm (1.6–2.4 in) and was connected to the belt by sloped armor that was 40–50 mm (1.6–2.0 in) thick. The forward conning tower had 150 mm (5.9 in) thick sides and a 30 mm (1.2 in) thick roof. The rear conning tower was less well-protected; its sides were only 80 mm thick and its roof was 20 mm (0.79 in) thick. The main battery gun turrets were armored with 150 mm thick steel plates on the sides and 30 mm thick roofs. The 15 cm turrets were protected by 100 mm thick sides and 80 mm thick gun shields.

=== Planned conversion of Roon ===
In 1918, the design staff prepared plans to convert Roon into a seaplane tender based on earlier conversions that included the light cruiser Stuttgart. By this time, Roon had been disarmed; the proposal involved the installation of a hangar aft of the main superstructure, with equipment to handle four seaplanes. She would have been armed with a battery of six 15 cm L/45 guns and six 8.8 cm flak guns, though this was never carried out due to the end of the war later that year.

== Construction ==
Construction data
Name	Builder	Namesake	Laid down	Launched	Commissioned
Roon	Kaiserliche Werft, Kiel	Albrecht von Roon	1 August 1902	27 June 1903	5 April 1906
Yorck	Blohm & Voss, Hamburg	Ludwig Yorck von Wartenburg	25 April 1903	14 May 1904	21 November 1905

== Service history ==
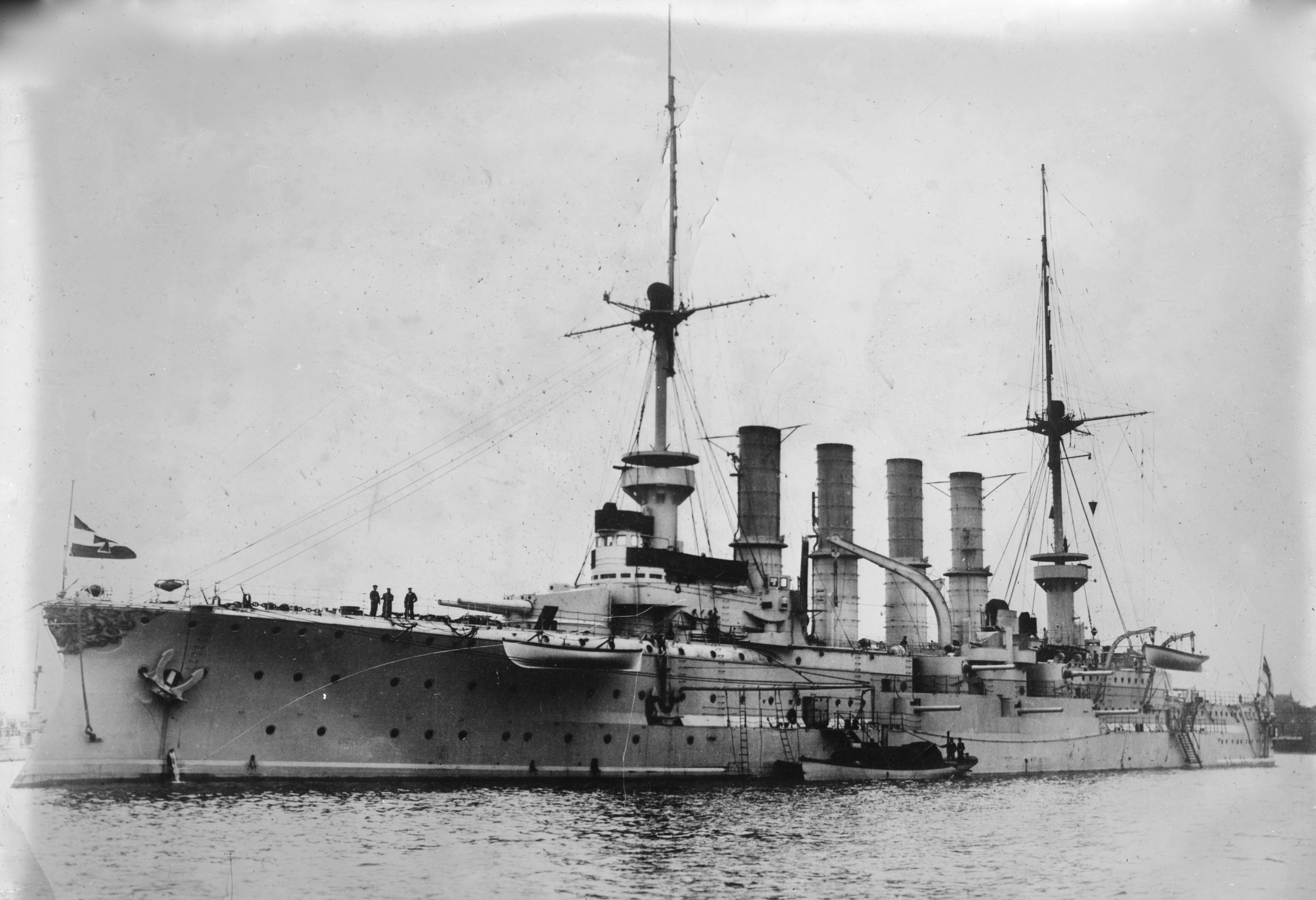
Roon, likely during her visit to the United States in 1907

On entering service, Yorck joined I Scouting Group, the reconnaissance squadron of the Heimatflotte (Home Fleet). She served as the group flagship for much of her early career, and when Roon joined her in late 1906, the latter vessel became the flagship of the deputy commander (though Roon alternated in this role with the armored cruiser Friedrich Carl). In 1907, Roon was detached for a visit to the United States to represent Germany at the Jamestown Exposition. Both vessels made long-distance cruises in the Atlantic in the late 1900s in company with I Scouting Group or the entire fleet, which was by then renamed the High Seas Fleet, including one that concluded with a visit to Spain in 1908. Apart from these voyages, the ships were primarily occupied with an uneventful routine of peacetime training exercises. Roon was decommissioned in September 1911, her place in the squadron having been taken by more modern battlecruisers. Yorck was involved in a collision with the torpedo boat S178 in March 1913 that resulted in the sinking of the latter vessel. Yorck was decommissioned shortly thereafter, with most of her crew being transferred to commission the new battlecruiser Seydlitz.

=== World War I ===
Yorck underway, c. 1914

Following the outbreak of World War I in July 1914, both cruisers were mobilized and assigned to III Scouting Group in August, which was initially assigned to the High Seas Fleet in the North Sea; Roon served as the group flagship.

Both ships were present in the reconnaissance screen for the High Seas Fleet when it sailed to provide distant support to I Scouting Group during the raid on Yarmouth in November; on returning to Wilhelmshaven on the night of 3 November, the ships encountered heavy fog and were forced to anchor in the Schillig roadstead outside the port to avoid running into the defensive minefields there. In the early hours of 4 November, Yorck's commander decided that visibility had improved enough to enter the port, but in the haze he led the ship into one of the minefields. Yorck struck a pair of mines in quick succession and sank with heavy loss of life. Roon continued to operate with the main fleet, taking part in the raid on Scarborough, Hartlepool, and Whitby in December. She briefly encountered a pair of British destroyers during the operation, but neither side opened fire.

By early 1915, it had become clear to the German naval command that older vessels like Roon were too slow and insufficiently armored to take part in an action with the powerful British Grand Fleet, and so III Scouting Group was transferred to the Baltic Sea in April, where it was dissolved and its ships used to constitute the Reconnaissance Forces of the Baltic, with Roon serving as the deputy commander's flagship. She thereafter took part in a series of offensive operations against Russian forces, beginning with a joint Army–Navy assault on Libau in May. This was followed by several sweeps into the central Baltic in May and June to try to catch Russian vessels, which culminated in the battle of the Åland Islands in early July. During this action, a group of Russian cruisers attacked several German vessels on a minelaying operation and Roon sortied to reinforce the German ships. Roon engaged the Russian armored cruiser Bayan and scored a hit, but was hit several times in return before the Germans disengaged.

Roon participated in the battle of the Gulf of Riga in August 1915 and bombarded Russian positions at Zerel on the Sworbe Peninsula in company with the armored cruiser Prinz Heinrich. The two cruisers surprised a group of Russian destroyers and damaged one of them before the Russians fled. By late 1915, the increased threat of British submarines, demonstrated by the sinking of Prinz Adalbert in October, convinced the German naval command to withdraw the remaining armored cruisers still in service (by this point, just Roon and Prinz Heinrich). Roon was disarmed in 1916 and used as a training ship and a floating barracks. Design work commenced in 1918 to convert the ship into a seaplane tender; work was planned to last a period of 20 months. The shipyard that was to carry out the conversion had higher priority projects, which delayed the conversion, and the war ended before the project could be carried out. As a result of Germany's defeat, and the strict disarmament clauses imposed by the Treaty of Versailles in 1919, the ship was stricken from the naval register on 25 November 1920 and scrapped the following year at Kiel-Nordmole.
