= Scharnhorst-class cruiser =

Class of armored cruisers of the German Imperial Navy

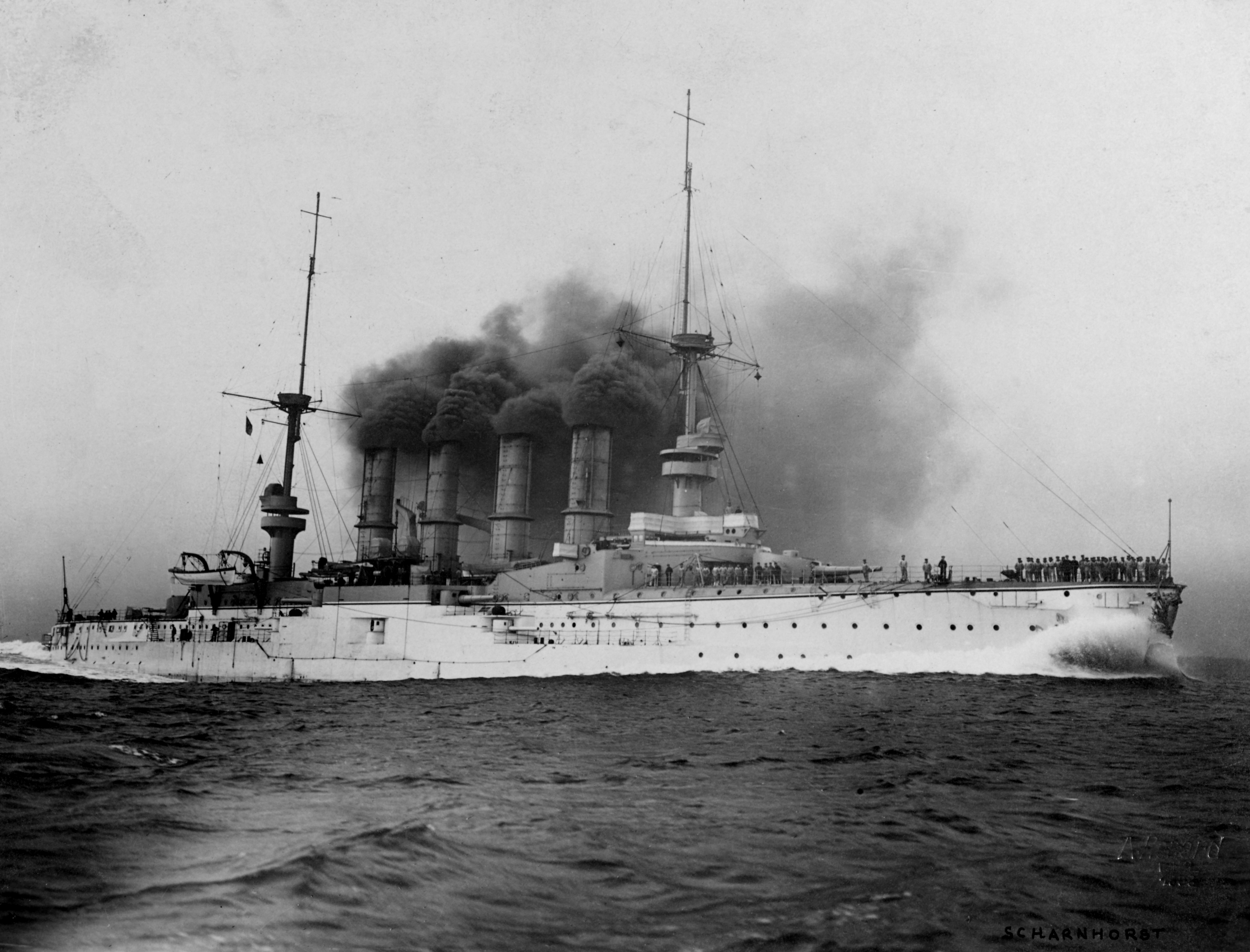
- SMS Scharnhorst

Class overview
- Name: Scharnhorst-class cruiser
- Builders: AG Weser; Blohm and Voss
- Operators: Imperial German Navy
- Preceded by: Roon class
- Succeeded by: SMS Blücher
- Built: 1904–1908
- In service: 1907–1914
- Completed: 2
- Lost: 2

General characteristics
- Type: Armored cruiser
- Displacement: Full load: 12,985 t (12,780 long tons)
- Length: 144.60 m (474 ft 5 in)
- Beam: 21.60 m (70 ft 10 in)
- Draft: 8.37 m (27 ft 6 in)
- Installed power: 18 × water-tube boilers; 26,000 PS (25,640 ihp)
- Propulsion: 3 × triple-expansion steam engines; 3 × screw propellers
- Speed: 22.5 knots (42 km/h)
- Crew: 52 officers; 788 enlisted men
- Armament: 8 × 21 cm (8.3 in) SK L/40 guns; 6 × 15 cm (5.9 in) SK L/40 guns; 18 × 8.8 cm (3.5 in) SK L/35 guns; 4 × 45 cm (17.7 in) torpedo tubes
- Armor: Belt: 150 mm (5.9 in); Turrets: 170 mm (6.7 in); Deck: 35 to 60 mm (1.4 to 2.4 in)

The Scharnhorst class was a class of armored cruisers built by the German Kaiserliche Marine (Imperial Navy). The ships were the culmination of a series of designs that began with the cruiser Prinz Heinrich. The class comprised two ships, Scharnhorst and Gneisenau, which were built between 1904 and 1908. They were about 20% larger than the Roon-class cruisers that preceded them. The increase in size permitted an increase in the main armament of 21 cm (8.2 inch) guns from four to eight and to improve armor protection and raise top speed. As a result of these changes, historians have assessed the Scharnhorst class to be the first German armored cruiser design to reach equality with their foreign counterparts.

After briefly serving in home waters, Scharnhorst and Gneisenau were assigned to the East Asia Squadron in 1909 and 1910, respectively. Scharnhorst relieved the old armored cruiser Fürst Bismarck as the squadron flagship. While in East Asia, the two Scharnhorst-class cruisers patrolled the region to protect German interests, including during the Xinhai Revolution in China.

Both ships had short careers; after the outbreak of World War I, they departed East Asia and crossed the Pacific with the rest of the East Asia Squadron in an attempt to return home, bombarding the French town of Papeete on the way. After arriving off the coast of South America, the ships destroyed a British force at the Battle of Coronel on 1 November 1914 and inflicted upon the Royal Navy its first major defeat in a century. The defeat spurred the British to send superior forces to hunt down and destroy the East Asia Squadron. Most of the squadron, including both Scharnhorst-class ships, was annihilated at the Battle of the Falkland Islands on 8 December.

== Design ==
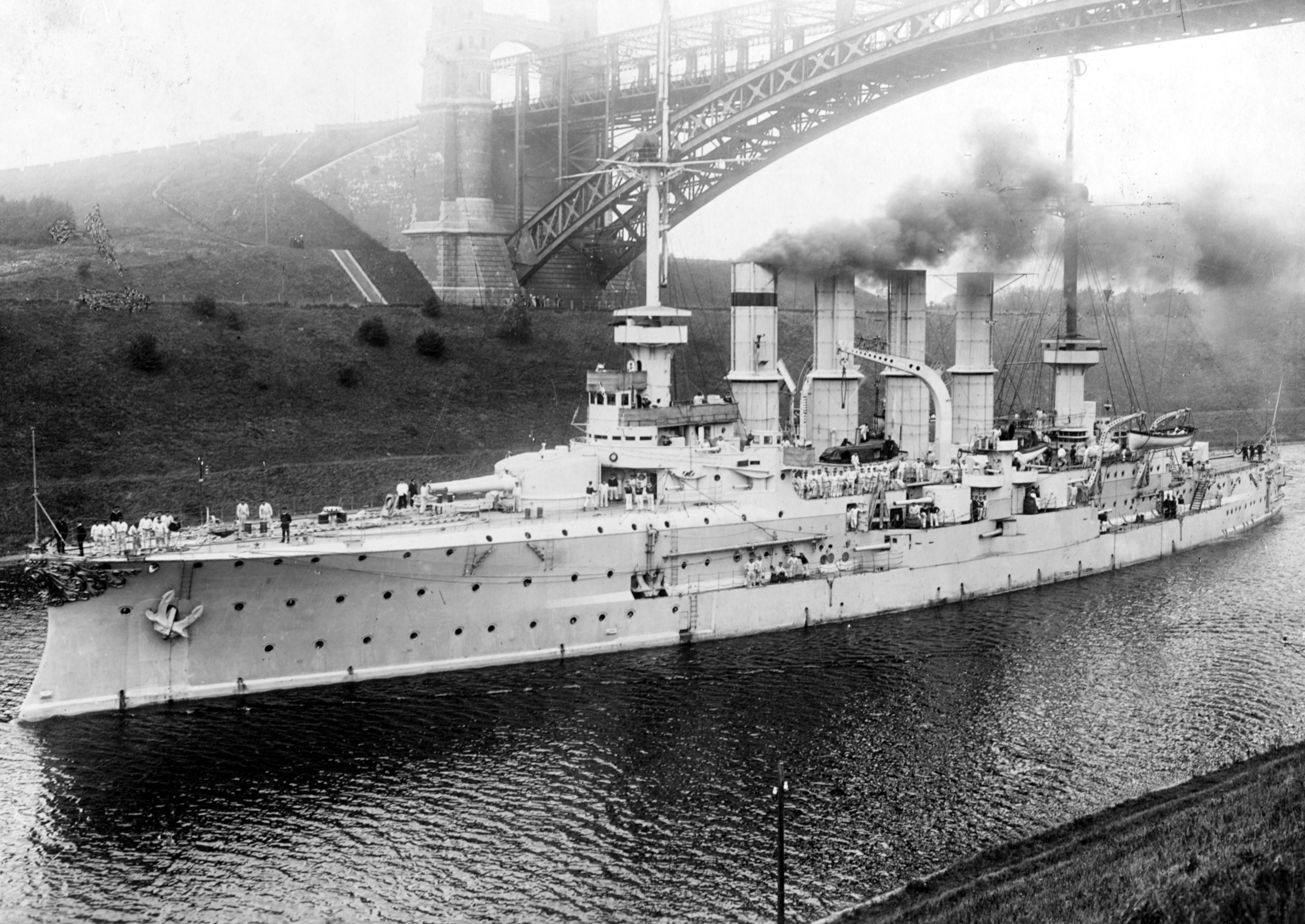
Yorck of the preceding Roon class, the basis for the Scharnhorst design

The Second Naval Law in Germany, passed in 1900, projected a force of fourteen armored cruisers for both overseas service in Germany's colonial empire and as scouts for the main battle fleet in German waters. (Note: Armored cruisers were vessels that generally possessed side armor intended to serve on foreign stations, as a fast wing of a fleet of battleships, or to attack or protect merchant shipping. Side armor differentiated them from large protected cruisers that only incorporated an armor deck for defense against enemy fire.) The naval expansion program was primarily directed against the British Royal Navy, then the world's preeminent naval force. Germany's armored cruiser force followed a series of iterative developments based on the cruiser Prinz Heinrich and continued through the Prinz Adalbert and Roon classes; the Scharnhorst class represented the culmination of that evolutionary development.

During the design process for the class, the General Department of the Imperial Naval Office issued a request that the new cruisers be capable of fighting in the line of battle in the event that German battleships were damaged and unable to continue fighting. Up to this point, this had not been a consideration in German armored cruiser construction, and so a significant increase in both firepower and armor protection was required to accommodate it. Additionally, firing tests at the Meppen range demonstrated that the 100 mm (3.9 in) belt armor of earlier German armored cruisers could not defeat medium-caliber shells at expected battle ranges. The necessary improvements to meet the General Department's requirements in turn meant much larger ships, and the Scharnhorsts were accordingly about 2,000 metric tons (1,970 long tons; 2,200 short tons) heavier than the preceding Roon-class cruisers, amounting to a 20% increase in displacement.

The weight increase secured a doubling of the number of main battery guns, a 50% increase in belt armor, and an increase in top speed by more than a knot over the Roon class. The speed increase was achieved by the addition of two boilers that provided 7,100 metric horsepower (7,000 ihp) more power for the propulsion system. Several other minor changes were introduced, including a strengthening of the tertiary battery of 8.8 cm (3.5 in) guns to the number of weapons used in contemporary battleships like the Deutschland class. The design staff considered adding a pair of these guns to the conning tower roof abreast of the bridge, but experience with the same arrangement on the Braunschweig-class battleships demonstrated the excessive blast effect interfered with control of the ships, and the idea was dropped from the Scharnhorst design.

As a result of these improvements, the two Scharnhorst-class ships—Scharnhorst and Gneisenau—were the first German armored cruisers to compare favorably to its foreign counterparts, according to the historian Aidan Dodson. According to the naval historian Hugh Lyon, speaking on all of the armored cruisers built in Germany in the early 1900s, "when compared to their British contemporaries they do not show up particularly well, in fact, with the possible exception of the last pair, Scharnhorst and Gneisenau, it is probably true to say that the armored cruisers were Germany's worst designed and least battleworthy ships in service in 1905."

=== General characteristics ===
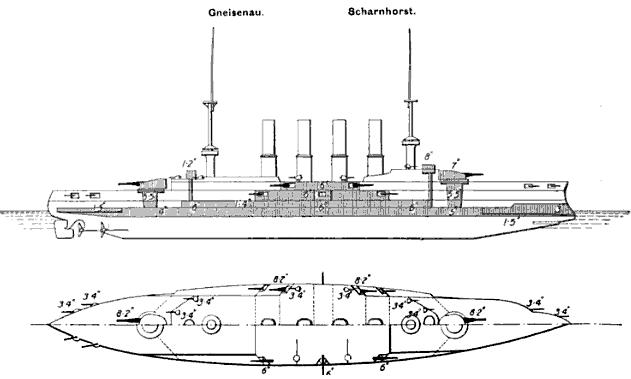
Line drawing of the Scharnhorst class

The ships of the class were 144.6 meters (474 ft 5 in) long overall, and 143.8 m (471 ft 9 in) long at the waterline. They had a beam of 21.6 m (70 ft 10 in), a draft of 8.37 m (27 ft 6 in), and displaced 11,616 t (11,433 long tons; 12,804 short tons) standard, and 12,985 t (12,780 long tons; 14,314 short tons) at full load. The ships' hulls were constructed of transverse and longitudinal steel frames, over which the outer hull plating was riveted. The vessels had 15 watertight compartments and a double bottom that ran for 50% of the length of the hull. Their hulls featured a pronounced ram bow and a whaleback-type forecastle. The upper deck extended from the forecastle up to the aft gun turret, where it stepped down to main deck level. The ships had a fairly minimal superstructure, consisting primarily of an armored conning tower forward, along with an open bridge, and a smaller, secondary conning tower aft. Both ships were fitted with a pair of heavy military masts.

Like the preceding classes of armored cruisers, Scharnhorst and Gneisenau were good sea boats, and their design further improved on their seaworthiness. They also maneuvered well and were responsive to the helm; steering was controlled with a single rudder. With the rudder turned to its maximum extent, the ships lost up to 60 percent of their speed, which was consistent with the previous German armored cruisers. The ships' design placed the casemates for the secondary battery too low, and as a result, they were exceedingly wet, which rendered them impossible to use in heavy seas.

The ships had a standard crew of 38 officers and 726 enlisted men. When Scharnhorst served as a squadron flagship, she had a larger crew, including an additional 14 officers and 62 men of the commanding admiral's staff. Gneisenau, when serving as the squadron deputy commander flagship, had an extra staff of 3 officers and 25 men. The ships carried a number of smaller vessels: two picket boats, two launches, one pinnace, two cutters, three yawls, and one dinghy. The cruisers carried a pair of large cranes amidships to handle the boats.

=== Propulsion machinery ===
The Scharnhorst-class ships used the same powerplant as in the preceding Roon class: three 3-cylinder triple-expansion steam engines. Each engine drove a single propeller; the one on the center shaft on Scharnhorst was 4.7 m (15 ft 5 in) in diameter while the outer two were 5 m (16 ft 5 in) wide. Gneisenau's screws were slightly smaller, at 4.6 m (15 ft 1 in) wide on the center shaft and 4.8 m (15 ft 9 in) on the outer pair. The triple expansion engines were supplied with steam by 18 coal-fired marine-type water-tube boilers with 36 fireboxes. The boilers were divided into five boiler rooms and were vented through four funnels located amidships.

The engines were designed to provide 26,000 metric horsepower (19,120 kW; 25,640 ihp), though on trials they achieved higher figures—28,782 PS (21,169 kW; 28,388 ihp) for Scharnhorst and 30,396 PS (22,356 kW; 29,980 ihp) for Gneisenau. The ships were rated at a top speed of 22.5 knots (41.7 km/h; 25.9 mph), though on trials Scharnhorst steamed at a maximum of 23.5 knots (43.5 km/h; 27.0 mph), while Gneisenau ran at 23.6 knots (43.7 km/h; 27.2 mph). The vessels carried 800 t (790 long tons; 880 short tons) of coal normally, though they were capable of storing up to 2,000 t (2,000 long tons; 2,200 short tons) of coal. This provided a range of 4,800 nautical miles (8,900 km; 5,500 mi) at a cruising speed of 14 knots (26 km/h; 16 mph). When the ships decreased speed slightly to 12 knots (22 km/h; 14 mph), the range increased to 5,120 nmi (9,480 km; 5,890 mi). The vessels' electrical plant consisted of four turbo-generators that delivered 260 kilowatts at 110 volts.

=== Armament ===
Aft gun turret on Scharnhorst

The ships' main battery armament consisted of eight 21 cm (8.3 in) SK L/40 guns, (Note: In Imperial German Navy gun nomenclature, "SK" (Schnelladekanone) denotes that the gun is quick loading, while the L/40 denotes the length of the gun. In this case, the L/40 gun is 40 calibers, meaning that the gun is 40 times as long as it is in bore diameter.) four in twin gun turrets, one fore and one aft of the main superstructure on the centerline, and the remaining four were mounted in single casemates located amidships. The turrets were the C/01 type, which was hydraulically operated, and the mounts provided a range of elevation from −5 to +30 degrees. The casemates used electric motors to train the guns, but elevation was hand-operated. These guns fired a 108-kilogram (238 lb) armor-piercing shell at a muzzle velocity of 780 meters per second (2,600 ft/s). The turrets had a maximum range of 16,200 m (53,100 ft), while the casemates could only engage targets out to 12,300 m (13,500 yd). The guns were supplied with 700 rounds in total.

The secondary armament included six 15 cm (5.9 in) SK L/40 guns in individual casemates. These guns fired a 40 kg (88 lb) shell at a muzzle velocity of 800 m/s (2,600 ft/s). They could be elevated to 30 degrees, which provided a maximum range of 13,900 m (15,200 yd). For close-range defense against torpedo boats, the ships carried a tertiary battery of eighteen 8.8 cm SK L/35 guns, which were mounted in individual casemates and pivot mounts in the superstructure. The 8.8 cm guns fired a 7 kg (15 lb) shell at a muzzle velocity of 770 m/s (2,500 ft/s). These guns had a maximum elevation of 25 degrees and a range of 9,100 m (10,000 yd).

As was customary for warships of the period, the Scharnhorst-class ships were equipped with four 45 cm (17.7 in) submerged torpedo tubes. One was mounted in the bow, one on each broadside, and the fourth was placed in the stern. The ships were supplied with a total of eleven torpedoes. The C/03 torpedo carried a 147.5-kilogram (325 lb) warhead and had a range of 1,500 m (4,900 ft) when set at a speed of 31 knots (57 km/h; 36 mph) and 3,000 m (9,800 ft) at 26 knots (48 km/h; 30 mph).

=== Armor ===
The ships of the Scharnhorst class were protected by Krupp cemented armor, which was the typical choice for German warships of the period. They had an armor belt that was 150 mm (5.9 in) thick in the central portion of the ship, extending from abreast the forward conning tower to just aft of the rear conning tower, where the propulsion machinery areas were located. This was a significant increase in thickness over earlier German armored cruisers. The belt decreased to 80 mm (3.1 in) on either end of the central citadel; the thinner belt extended all the way to the bow and almost completely to the stern, the extreme end of which was not armored. The entire belt was backed with teak planking. The main armored deck ranged in thickness from 60 mm (2.4 in) over critical areas to 35 mm (1.4 in) elsewhere. The deck sloped down to connect to the belt at its lower edge to provide additional resistance to incoming fire; this portion was between 40 and 55 mm (1.6 and 2.2 in) thick.

The forward conning tower had 200 mm (7.9 in) thick sides and a 30 mm (1.2 in) thick roof. The rear conning tower was less well-armored, with sides that were only 50 mm (2 in) thick and a roof that was 20 mm (0.79 in) thick. The main battery gun turrets had 170 mm (6.7 in) thick sides and 30 mm (1.2 in) thick roofs, while the amidships guns were protected with 150 mm (5.9 in) thick gun shields and 40 mm (1.6 in) thick roofs. The barbettes that supported the turrets were 140 mm (5.5 in) thick. The 15 cm battery was protected by a strake of armor that was 130 mm (5.1 in) thick, while the guns themselves were protected with 80 mm (3.1 in) thick shields.

== Ships ==
Gneisenau in a floating dry dock

Construction data
Name	Builder	Namesake	Laid down	Launched	Commissioned
Scharnhorst	Blohm & Voss, Hamburg	Gerhard von Scharnhorst	22 March 1905	23 March 1906	24 October 1907
Gneisenau	AG Weser, Bremen	August Neidhardt von Gneisenau	28 December 1904	14 June 1906	6 March 1908

== Service history ==
Upon commissioning, both ships of the class served with the reconnaissance force of the High Seas Fleet, Scharnhorst briefly serving as the flagship of I Scouting Group from mid-1908 to early 1909. During this period, they conducted routine training exercises, went on cruises with the rest of the fleet, and escorted Kaiser Wilhelm II's yacht on visits abroad. This included a major fleet cruise into the Atlantic Ocean in mid-1908. Early that year, Scharnhorst was badly damaged after she ran aground, necessitating significant repairs.

In early 1909, Scharnhorst was assigned to the East Asia Squadron, and Gneisenau joined her there in 1910. Scharnhorst served as the squadron flagship upon arriving in East Asia, replacing the older armored cruiser Fürst Bismarck. Over the following four years, the two ships cruised through the region, visiting numerous foreign ports and representing German interests. In 1911, they both moved to China to protect German nationals during the Xinhai Revolution, but no attacks from the warring parties in China materialized. Scharnhorst and Gneisenau were regarded as hosting well-trained crews; both ships won awards for their excellence at gunnery. By 1914, the squadron was commanded by Admiral Maximilian von Spee.

=== World War I ===
At the start of World War I on 28 July 1914, the two ships were in the Caroline Islands on a routine cruise; the rest of Spee's squadron was dispersed around the Pacific. The hostile attitude of Japan toward Germany convinced Spee to consolidate his force with the cruisers Leipzig and Dresden from the American station, and head for Chile to refuel. The flotilla would then attempt to return to Germany via the Atlantic. Spee also intended to attack the three British cruisers under the command of Admiral Christopher Cradock, then cruising in South American waters, along with any British shipping encountered. On 22 September, Scharnhorst and Gneisenau approached Papeete on Tahiti, in French Polynesia with the intention of seizing the coal stockpiled in the harbor. The ships conducted a short bombardment that resulted in the sinking of the old gunboat Zélée. However, Spee feared that the harbor had been mined, and decided to avoid the risk of entering the port to take the coal. The French had also set fire to the coal stocks to prevent the Germans from using it.

==== Battle of Coronel ====
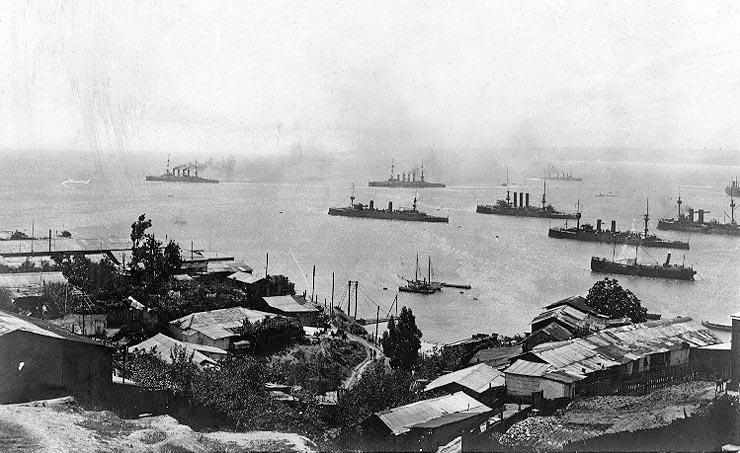
The German squadron (background) leaving Valparaíso on 3 November after the battle, with Scharnhorst and Gneisenau in the lead and Nürnberg following. In the middle distance are several vessels of the Chilean fleet.

By late October, the East Asia Squadron arrived off the coast of Chile; Spee had at his disposal the two Scharnhorsts and the light cruisers Dresden, Leipzig, and Nürnberg. On 30 October, Spee received reports that one of Cradock's cruisers was at Coronel, Chile, and he decided to try to attack it. Instead, when the Germans arrived off the port, they encountered Cradock's entire squadron (less the old pre-dreadnought battleship Canopus, which had been left behind due to her slow speed). The two sides spotted each other at around 17:00.

Because the German ships had an advantage in speed, Spee was able to keep the distance to 18 kilometers, before closing to 12 km (6.5 nmi) to engage the British flotilla at 19:00. Gneisenau engaged the armored cruiser Monmouth, scoring several hits and disabling most of her guns. Nürnberg then closed to point-blank range to attack Monmouth while Gneisenau joined her sister, which was engaged with the armored cruiser Good Hope. Scharnhorst hit Good Hope some 34 times; at least one of the shells penetrated Good Hope's ammunition magazines, which resulted in a tremendous explosion that destroyed the ship. In the meantime, Monmouth disappeared into the haze and then sank some time later. The British light cruiser Glasgow and the auxiliary cruiser Otranto both escaped under the cover of darkness.

The defeat was the first to be inflicted on the Royal Navy since the 1814 Battle of Plattsburgh. After news of the battle reached Kaiser Wilhelm II in Berlin, he ordered 300 Iron Crosses to be awarded to the men of Spee's squadron. Some six hours after news of the battle reached England, the First Sea Lord Admiral Jackie Fisher ordered Admiral John Jellicoe, the commander of the Grand Fleet, to detach the battlecruisers Invincible and Inflexible to hunt down the German ships. Vice Admiral Doveton Sturdee was placed in command of the flotilla, which also included the armored cruisers Carnarvon, Cornwall, Defence, and Kent, and the light cruisers Bristol and Glasgow, which had survived Coronel.

After refueling in Valparaíso, the East Asia Squadron departed to resume its voyage around South America, capturing merchant vessels along the way. As the squadron entered the South Atlantic, Spee made the decision to attack the British naval base in the Falkland Islands to destroy the British wireless transmitter located there.

==== Battle of the Falkland Islands ====
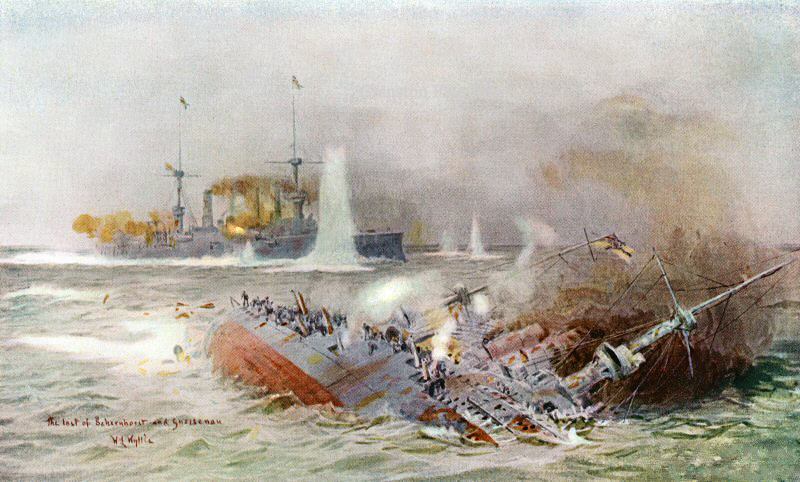
Scharnhorst rolls over and sinks while Gneisenau continues to fight.

Sturdee's ships reached the Falklands by the morning of 8 December, shortly before Spee's squadron arrived. Gneisenau and Nürnberg were sent to reconnoiter the port and attack British facilities, while the rest of the squadron stood out to sea. The British spotted the East Asia Squadron at 09:40; Spee was unaware that the British had sent the two battlecruisers, and when he observed them, he ordered his ships to withdraw. Despite the head start, the fast battlecruisers quickly caught up with the worn-out German ships, which had just completed a 16,000-nautical-mile (30,000 km; 18,000 mi) voyage without repairs, and were no longer capable of their best speeds. Once he had determined that he would not be able to outrun his pursuers, Spee turned his two armored cruisers around to try to delay them long enough for the light cruisers to escape, though Sturdee had foreseen this maneuver and detached his cruisers to chase the German light cruisers while Invincible and Inflexible remained focused on Scharnhorst and Gneisenau.

At approximately 13:20, the battlecruisers opened fire at a range of 14 kilometers (7.6 nmi). In the course of the battle, Spee repeatedly attempted to outmaneuver Sturdee to either close the range where his own guns would be effective against the battlecruisers, or escape into haze; he failed in both efforts. By 16:15, Scharnhorst was dead in the water and listing heavily; she sank shortly thereafter. Gneisenau then came under heavy fire from both battlecruisers and Carnarvon, and by 17:30, was burning badly after having been hit more than 50 times, many of them at close range. The captain ordered the ship to be scuttled, and the crew gave three cheers for the Kaiser before the vessel sank. Nürnberg and Leipzig were also sunk, though Dresden managed to escape temporarily, before she too was destroyed off Juan Fernández Island in March 1915. Some 2,200 men were killed, among them Spee.
