= 21 cm SK L/40 =

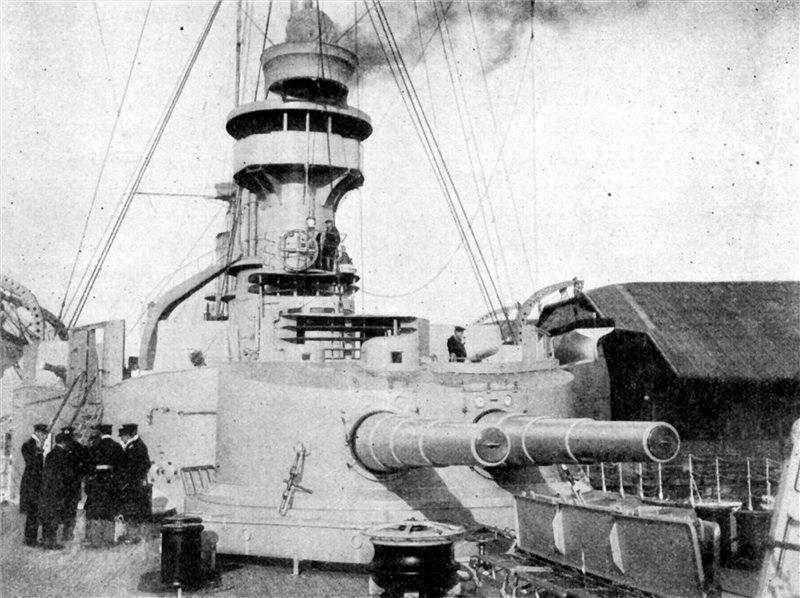
- A twin turret aboard SMS Scharnhorst
- Type: Naval gun Railway gun Coastal artillery
- Place of origin: German Empire

Service history
- In service: 1898−1945
- Used by: German Empire; Nazi Germany
- Wars: Boxer Rebellion; Venezuelan Crisis; World War I; World War II

Production history
- Designer: Krupp
- Designed: 1897−1904
- Manufacturer: Krupp
- Produced: 1898
- Variants: C/97; C/01; C/04

Specifications
- Mass: C/97: 16,500 kg (36,400 lb); C/01: 20,020 kg (44,140 lb); C/04: 18,900 kg (41,700 lb)
- Length: 8.4 m (27 ft 7 in)
- Barrel length: 7.8 m (25 ft 7 in)
- Shell weight: 108–113.5 kg (238–250 lb)
- Caliber: 210 mm (8.3 in) 40 caliber
- Breech: Cylindro-prismatic breech block
- Elevation: See Table
- Traverse: -150 to +150 °
- Rate of fire: 4-5 rpm
- Muzzle velocity: 780 m/s (2,600 ft/s)
- Maximum firing range: 12.4 km (7.7 mi) at +16° 16.3 km (10.1 mi) at +30°

The 21 cm Schnelladekanone Länge 40, abbreviated as 21 cm SK L / 40, was a German naval gun developed in the years before World War I that armed a number of the Imperial German Navy's protected and armored cruisers. Later spare guns were adapted to railway guns during World War I and later employed as coastal artillery during World War II.

== History ==
The 21 cm SKL/40 was produced in three versions. The C/97 model was the primary turret mounted armament of the Victoria Louise-class protected cruisers. The later C/01 was the primary turret mounted armament of the Prinz Adalbert, Roon, and Scharnhorst classes of armored cruisers. The Scharnhorst class were also armed with four C/04 guns in single casemate mounts amidships.

During the First World War eight guns were removed from the Victoria Louise-class after they were decommissioned in 1914–1915 and these formed two coastal defense batteries of four guns each. These two batteries named Freya and Hertha were stationed on the Belgian coast during the First World War. Early in the war three of the four armored cruisers of the Prinz Adalbert and Roon classes were lost to mines and submarines and twenty one of their spare guns were transferred to the Imperial German Army for land use. In 1916 the guns of SMS Roon also became available after it was decommissioned. In 1917 one of these guns was stationed at Cape Helles in Turkey to arm a coastal artillery unit. Seven other guns were converted to railway guns and they were referred to collectively as the 21 cm SK "Peter Adalbert". During the Second World War these guns were reemployed by coastal artillery units of the Wehrmacht.

== Construction ==
There were three versions of the 21 cm SKL/40. The C/97 version was used on the Victoria Louise class and was constructed of two layers of hoops and a cylindro-prismatic breech block. The C/01 version was designed for twin mounts that were used on the Prinz Adalbert, Roon and Scharnhorst classes had one extra layer of hoops at the rear of the gun. The C/04 version was similar to the C/01, but was designed for casemate mountings and did not have the extra layer of hoops of the C/01.

Mount Type	Description	Weight	Elevation	Ship Classes
TL C/97	single mount, hydraulic powered traverse and elevation, hand loaded shells	90 tonnes (99 short tons)	-5° to +30°	Victoria Louise-class
DrL C/01	twin mount, hydraulic powered traverse and elevation, pusher shell hoists	170–174 tonnes (187–192 short tons)	-5° to +30°	Prinz Adalbert class, Roon class, Scharnhorst class
MPL C/04	single casemate mount, electric powered traverse, hand powered elevation, hand loaded shells	46 tonnes (51 short tons)	-5° to +16°	Scharnhorst class

== Bibliography ==
- Friedman, Norman (2011). Naval Weapons of World War One. Barnsley, South Yorkshire, UK: Seaforth. ISBN 978-1-84832-100-7.
- http://www.navweaps.com/Weapons/WNGER_827-40_skc95.php
- Schmalenbach, Paul (1983). "German Navy Large Bore Guns Operational Ashore During World War I". Warship International. XX (2): 123–153. ISSN 0043-0374.
