= Prinz Adalbert-class cruiser =

Class of armored cruisers of the German Imperial Navy

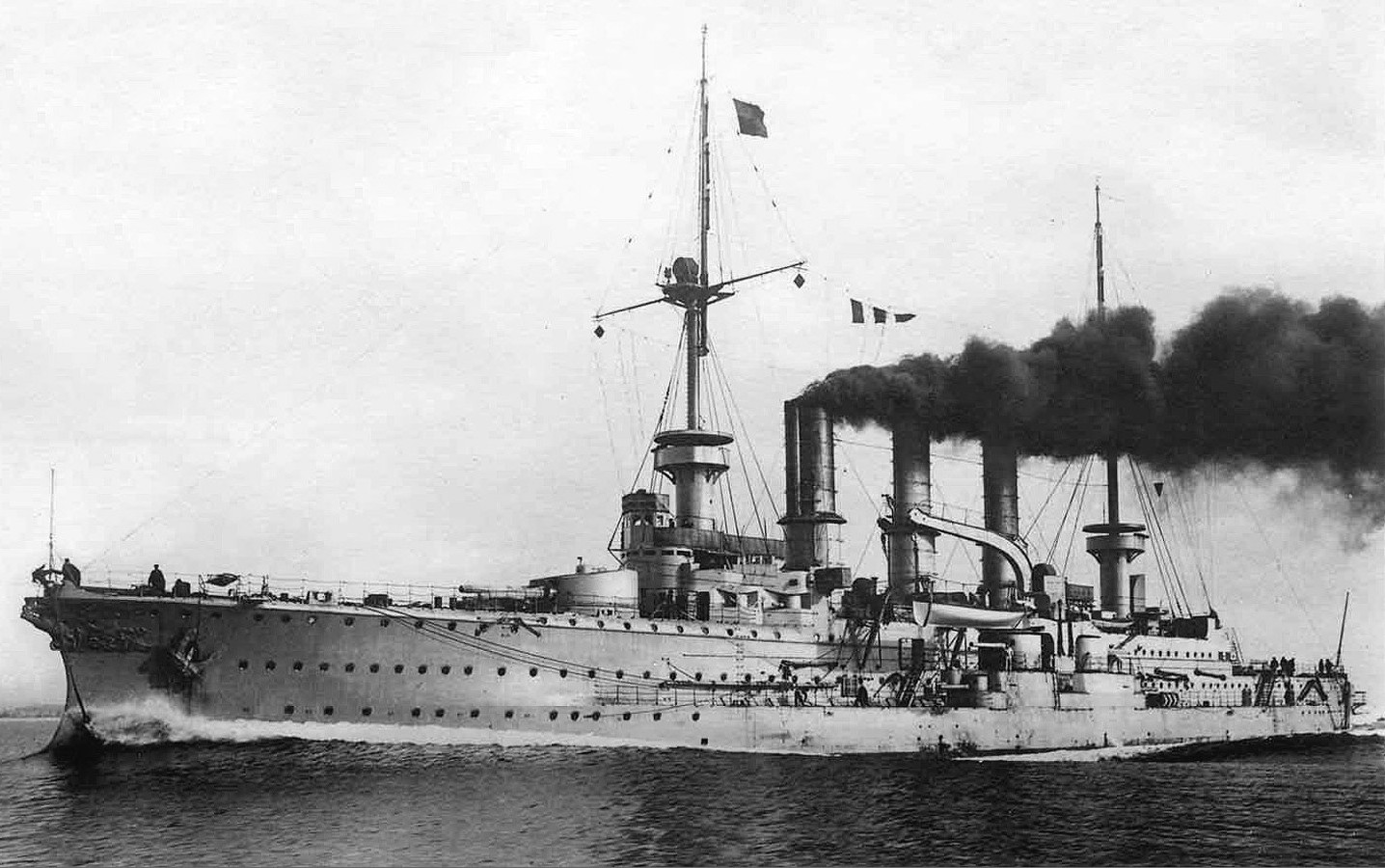
- SMS Prinz Adalbert

Class overview
- Name: Prinz Adalbert
- Operators: Imperial German Navy
- Preceded by: SMS Prinz Heinrich
- Succeeded by: Roon class
- Built: 1900–1904
- In service: 1903–1915
- Completed: 2
- Lost: 2

General characteristics
- Type: Armored cruiser
- Displacement: Normal: 9,087 metric tons (8,943 long tons); Full load: 9,875 t (9,719 long tons)
- Length: 126.5 m (415 ft) o/a
- Beam: 19.6 m (64 ft 4 in)
- Draft: 7.9 m (25 ft 11 in)
- Installed power: 14 × Dürr water-tube boilers; 16,200 PS (16,000 ihp)
- Propulsion: 3 × screw propellers; 3 × triple-expansion steam engines
- Speed: 20 knots (37 km/h; 23 mph)
- Range: 5,080 nautical miles (9,410 km; 5,850 mi) at 12 knots (22 km/h; 14 mph)
- Crew: 35 officers; 551 sailors
- Armament: 4 × 21 cm (8.3 in) SK L/40 guns; 10 × 15 cm (5.9 in) SK L/40 guns; 12 × 8.8 cm (3.5 in) SK L/35 guns; 4 × 45 cm (17.7 in) torpedo tubes
- Armor: Belt: 100 mm (3.9 in); Turrets: 150 mm (5.9 in); Deck: 40 to 80 mm (1.6 to 3.1 in); Conning tower: 150 mm

The Prinz Adalbert class was a pair of armored cruisers built for the German Kaiserliche Marine (Imperial Navy) under the terms of the First Naval Law, which initiated a major naval expansion program. Two ships of the class were built, Prinz Adalbert and Friedrich Carl, between 1900 and 1904. Their design was heavily based on Germany's previous armored cruiser, Prinz Heinrich, with a series of incremental improvements. These included a revised armor layout to improve internal protection, along with an upgraded main battery armament that consisted of four 21 cm (8.3 in) guns instead of the two 24 cm (9.4 in) carried by Prinz Heinrich. The new ships also received more powerful propulsion systems, making them slightly faster. Prinz Adalbert spent her peacetime career as a gunnery-training ship while Friedrich Carl initially served as the flagship of the Heimatflotte's (Home Fleet) reconnaissance forces. By 1909, she had been replaced by more modern cruisers and joined Prinz Adalbert as a training vessel.

Following the outbreak of World War I in July 1914, both vessels were mobilized; Friedrich Carl was assigned to the cruiser division in the Baltic Sea and was sunk by Russian naval mines off Memel in November, though most of her crew was safely taken off. Prinz Adalbert initially served in the North Sea, supporting the raid on Yarmouth in November 1914 before transferring to the Baltic to replace her lost sister. Prinz Adalbert had little better luck, being torpedoed by British submarines twice in 1915, the first, in July, caused serious damage and necessitated lengthy repairs. The second, in October, caused an internal magazine explosion that destroyed the ship and killed 672; only 3 sailors survived. The sinking was the greatest single loss of life for the German fleet in the Baltic during the war.

== Background ==
The First Naval Law in Germany, passed on 1 April 1898, projected a force of twelve armored cruisers to be employed on overseas duties in the German colonies or in home waters for operations with the main battle fleet. (Note: Armored cruisers generally possessed side armor, which differentiated them from large protected cruisers that only incorporated an armor deck for defense against enemy fire. They were intended to serve on foreign stations, as a fast wing of a fleet of battleships, or to attack or protect merchant shipping.) Of these, six were to serve with the main battle fleet, three were to be stationed in the German colonial empire, and the other three would remain in reserve. By 1898, the German navy possessed ten vessels it counted in the armored cruiser category, which meant that two more vessels needed to be built to comply with the Naval Law's requirements. (Note: These were: the old, converted ironclad warships König Wilhelm, Kaiser, and Deutschland; the large protected cruisers Kaiserin Augusta and the five Victoria Louise-class cruisers; and the armored cruiser Fürst Bismarck.) But in addition to the fixed numerical requirement, the Naval Law also mandated that a ship would be considered obsolete once it reached 20 years of age, and three of the existing cruisers were well overage. Thus, the navy needed to build five new cruisers as soon as possible to meet the requirements laid out in the law.

The first vessel to be ordered under the provisions of the Naval Law became the armored cruiser SMS Prinz Heinrich; the ship was ordered under the provisional designation "A". This ship was an alteration of the design of an earlier vessel, Fürst Bismarck, equipped with fewer guns and thinner but more comprehensive armor in a trade-off for higher speed and lower cost. These reductions were necessary from a financial perspective, given the scale of the German naval armament program. But they left many unanswered questions, particularly over the armament and speed of future ships, as compromise solutions had to have been adopted for Prinz Heinrich to meet the strict financial limitations. The ship nevertheless became the basis for the armored cruisers that would be built in Germany to fill the fleet screening role.

According to the law, one large cruiser was to be built per year until the full complement of twelve vessels were in service, so design work began immediately on a follow-on vessel to fulfill the requirement. In practice, however, construction of the next cruiser—designated "B" until a name was formally chosen—was deferred by one year, owing to the need to build a total of seven new battleships by 1900. The deferment allowed more time for the designers to improve upon the basic Prinz Adalbert template and attempt to resolve the deficiencies in armament and speed.

== Design ==
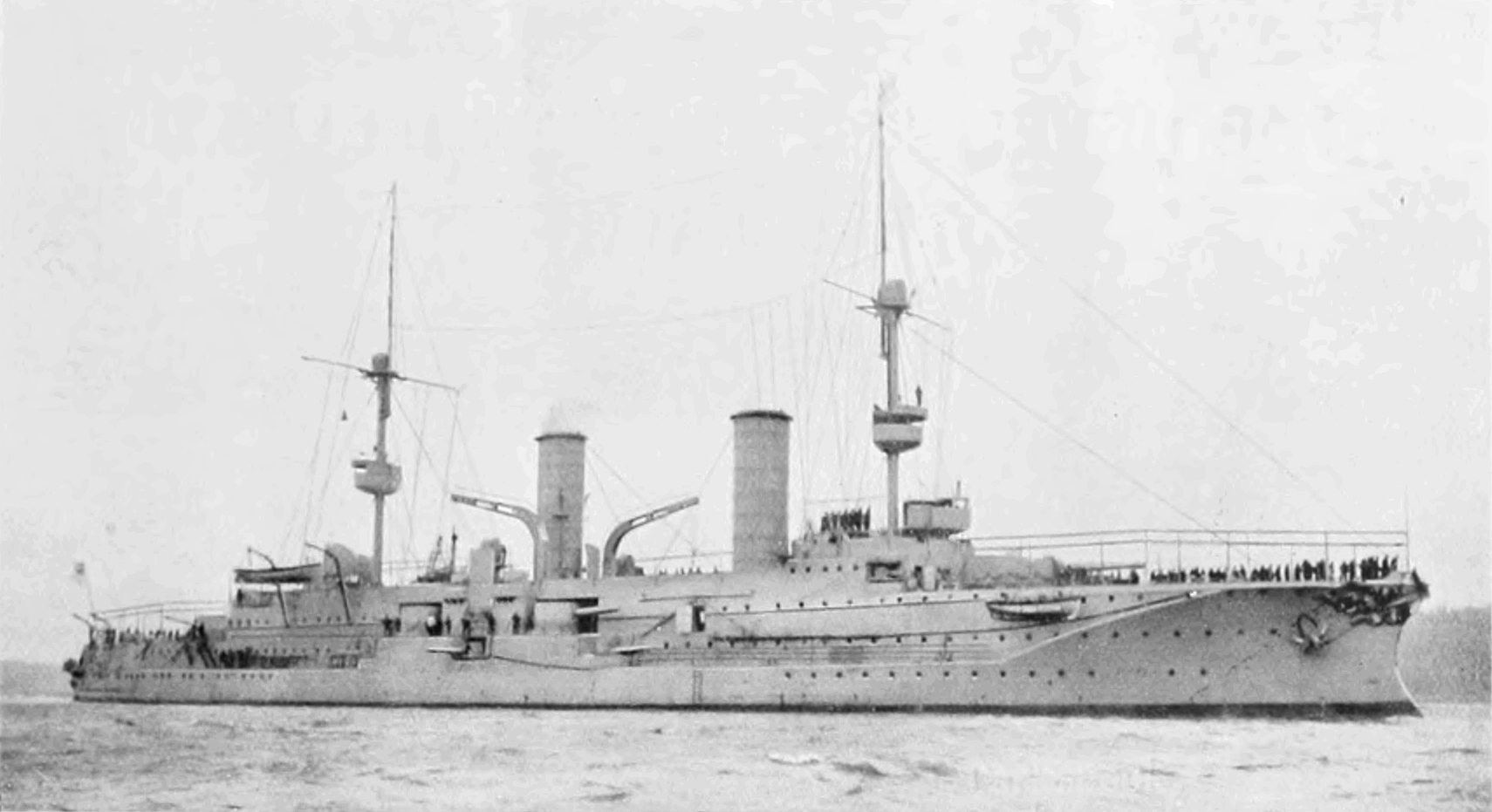
Prinz Heinrich, the basis for the Prinz Adalbert design

Discussions over the main open questions—speed and armament—resumed in early 1899 and included a paper submitted by Konteradmiral (KAdm—Rear Admiral) Max von Fischel, the head of the military section of the Reichsmarineamt (RMA—Imperial Naval Office). He argued that speed was the utmost priority and should be increased over that of Prinz Heinrich. If the weight of the new armament allowed it, he also stated that the two single 24 cm (9.4 in) guns mounted in the earlier cruiser be replaced by four 21 cm (8.3 in) guns in twin-gun turrets. The basis of his argument lay in the fact that the new cruiser was most likely to engage other enemy armored cruisers, not battleships, and that contemporary foreign cruisers carried armor no thicker than 15 cm (5.9 in), and the smaller gun was more than capable of penetrating such armor at normal battle ranges. The smaller gun also had a higher rate of fire, and doubling the number of barrels improved fire direction. Fischel also proposed raising the armor deck to increase reserve buoyancy in the case of flooding through shell holes above the waterline.

Fischel's paper passed to KAdm Wilhelm Büchsel, the head of the RMA's technical department, to be developed in greater detail, with particular emphasis on what weight savings would be required in other aspects to meet Fischel's proposal for the armament. The layout of the propulsion system was considered, specifically whether it would be possible to revert from a three-propeller arrangement back to two screws, but the designers concluded that it would be impossible to fit engines large enough to meet the speed requirements given the space allowed. Büchsel's report was discussed on 9 June in a meeting of senior RMA personnel, including Admiral Alfred von Tirpitz, the head of the RMA. Tirpitz objected to the stated top speed of the new cruiser, which was set to be 20.5 knots (38.0 km/h; 23.6 mph), since this did not meet his requirement that the ship must be at least three knots faster than the latest battleships. He therefore requested that the design department try to increase speed by half a knot. The officers agreed that the change in armament was acceptable as proposed, but they noted that it amounted to an increase in cost that was best left undisclosed for the time being, owing to financial difficulties with other construction projects.

Tirpitz then presented the proposal to Kaiser Wilhelm II for his approval, noting the planned improvements over Prinz Heinrich. In addition to the new main battery, the citadel armor would be extended to cover the sides of the main turret substructures, and a heavy military mast would be fitted. These improvements would come at the cost of shortening the casemate for the secondary guns and reducing the standard coal storage, along with accepting a slight increase in displacement. The basic hull size and shape remained largely identical, as did the ships' secondary battery. By this time, the speed issue remained unresolved, as the designers grappled with the problems of providing enough power from the boilers and fitting the engines into the space provided, since the dimensions of the new ship could not be increased. These struggles continued for some time, as the speed calculations indicated that the necessary power would require an increased displacement, which in turn mandated greater buoyancy from the hull structure, which reduced the hydrodynamic efficiency of the hull shape (and thus negated any increase in speed). Eventually, the designers were able to fit a propulsion system rated to produce 16,200 metric horsepower (16,000 ihp), slightly less than the 16,500 PS (16,300 ihp) that was predicted to be necessary, though it was hoped this would be sufficient.

Wilhelm II approved the proposed design on 9 October, but further detailed work continued for some time. The designers eventually came to the conclusion that the desired power output was unattainable, given the constraints on the ship's size and hull shape, and so they settled for the 16,200 PS output with the hope that future developments might allow the boilers to be run at greater power. The 1900/01 naval budget was approved on 5 April 1900, allowing the contract for the first member of the Prinz Adalbert class to be placed. Nearly a year later, on 16 March 1901, Captain Rudolf von Eickstedt informed Tirpitz that recent model tests suggested that the ship would require as much as 18,000 PS (18,000 ihp) to reach her intended top speed. By that time, the second ship of the class, ordered as Ersatz König Wilhelm, had begun construction as well. It was determined that coverings for the ships' propeller shafts would provide an increase in hydrodynamic efficiency equivalent to about 500 PS (490 ihp), though "B" was too far advanced in construction to allow them to be installed.

=== General characteristics ===
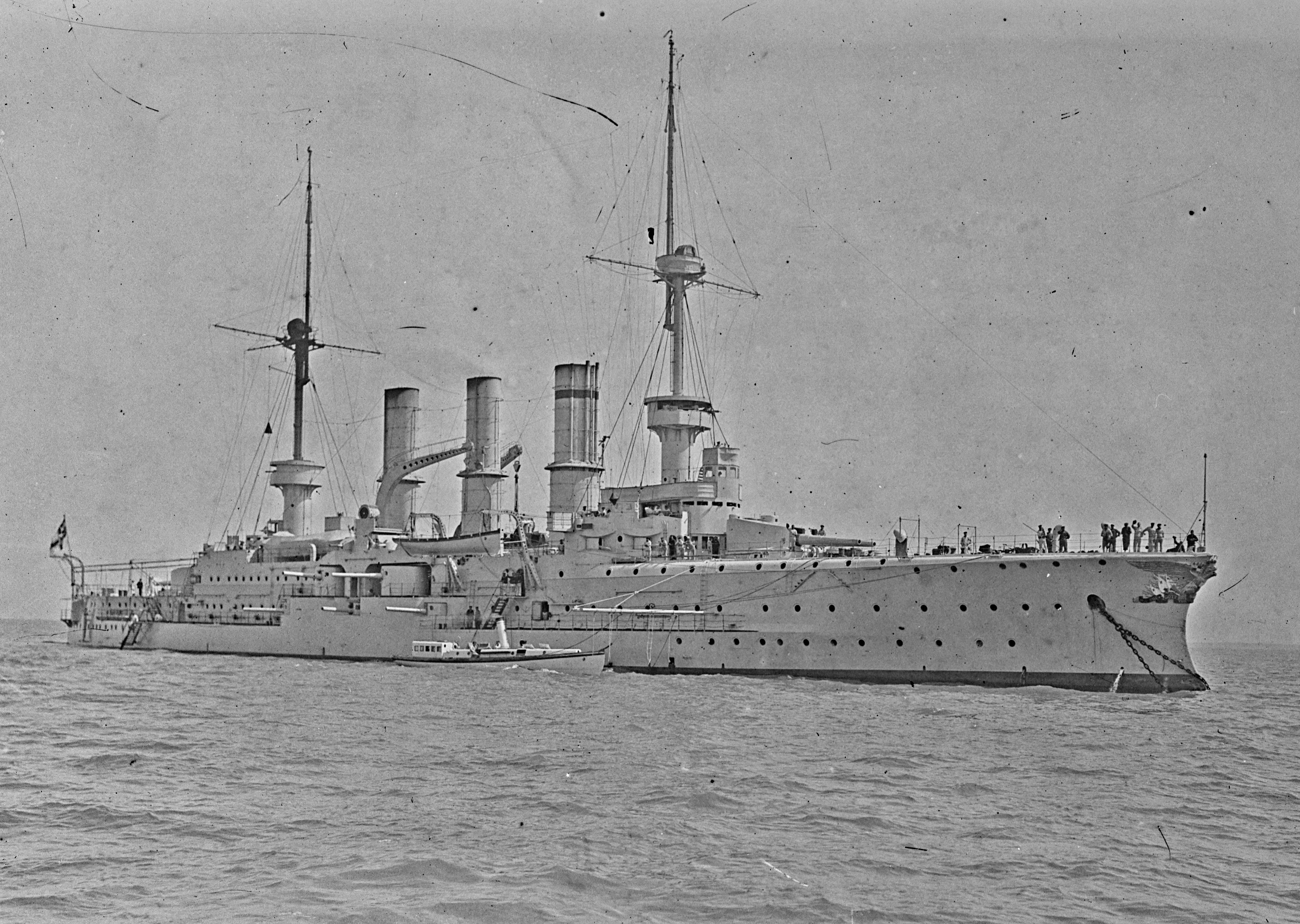
Friedrich Carl early in her career

The ships of the Prinz Adalbert class were 124.9 meters (410 ft) long at the waterline and 126.5 m (415 ft) overall, and had a beam of 19.6 m (64 ft). The ships were designed to displace 9,087 metric tons (8,943 long tons; 10,017 short tons), but at full load displaced up to 9,875 t (9,719 long tons; 10,885 short tons); they had a draft of 7.43 m (24.4 ft) forward and 7.9 m (26 ft) aft. The ships' hulls were constructed from transverse and longitudinal steel frames, over which the steel hull plates were riveted. The vessels contained fourteen watertight compartments and a double bottom that extended for 60 percent of the length of the hull. Their superstructure consisted of a primary conning tower forward with a bridge structure and a larger structure further aft that had a small, secondary conning tower atop it. The designers reverted to the use of two heavy military masts that had been discarded in Prinz Heinrich's design.

The Germans regarded the vessels as good sea boats, with gentle motion when the ships' lower fuel bunkers were full. The ships were responsive to commands from the helm, and steering was controlled with a single rudder. They lost up to 60 percent speed with the rudder hard over. While steaming in heavy seas, they suffered only minimal speed loss. The ships had a standard crew of 35 officers and 551 enlisted men, though when serving as a squadron flagship this could be augmented by another 9 officers and 44 enlisted men. The ships were equipped with several boats, including a pair of picket boats, a launch, a pinnace, two cutters, two yawls, and two dinghies.

Prinz Adalbert and Friedrich Carl were powered by three vertical 3-cylinder triple-expansion engines; the center shaft drove a three-bladed screw 4.5 m (15 ft) in diameter, while the two outboard shafts powered four-bladed screws 4.8 m (16 ft) in diameter. The engines were supplied with steam by fourteen coal-fired Dürr boilers, a type of water-tube boiler produced by Düsseldorf-Ratinger Röhrenkesselfabrik, which were ducted into three funnels. Compared to those on earlier German cruisers, the propeller shafts for Friedrich Karl were shortened and better faired into the hull lines to reduce the amount of drag they induced, and they were made self-supporting; these changes were incorporated into all future cruisers and battleships built by the Kaiserliche Marine.

The propulsion system was rated at 16,200 metric horsepower (16,000 ihp) for Prinz Adalbert and 17,000 metric horsepower (16,770 ihp) for Friedrich Carl and top speeds of 20 knots (37 km/h; 23 mph) and 20.5 knots (38.0 km/h; 23.6 mph), respectively. Both ships reached higher horsepower figures on trials, though their speeds were not significantly improved. The ships were designed to carry 750 t (740 long tons; 830 short tons) of coal, though storage could be increased to 1,630 t (1,600 long tons). This enabled a maximum range of up to 5,080 nautical miles (9,410 km; 5,850 mi) at a cruising speed of 12 knots (22 km/h; 14 mph). Electrical power was supplied by four generators with a total output of 246 kilowatts (330 hp) at 110 volts.

=== Armament ===
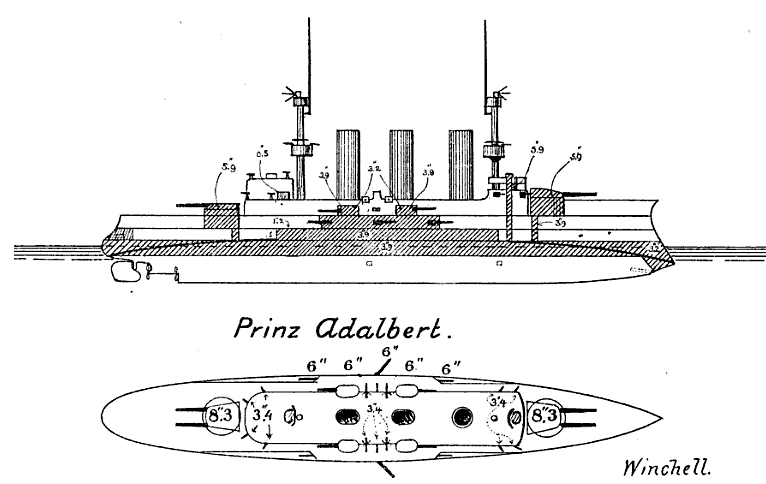
Line-drawing of Prinz Adalbert; the shaded areas represent the portions of the ship protected by armor

Prinz Adalbert and Friedrich Carl were armed with a main battery of four 21 cm (8.3 in) SK L/40 guns in two twin turrets, (Note: In Imperial German Navy gun nomenclature, "SK" (Schnelladekanone) denotes that the gun is quick loading, while the L/40 denotes the length of the gun. In this case, the L/40 gun is 40 calibers, meaning that the gun's length is forty times its bore diameter.) one on either end of the main superstructure fore and aft. The four guns were supplied with a total of 340 rounds of ammunition, or 85 shells per gun. The shells were a mixture of armor-piercing, high-explosive, and solid steel rounds. The C/04 turrets could depress to −5° and elevate to 30°, which provided a maximum range of 14,870 m (16,260 yd). Each mount was elevated and loaded by hand, but the turrets were rotated electrically. The 21 cm gun fired a 108-kilogram (238 lb) shell at a muzzle velocity of 780 m/s (2,559 ft/s). At a range of 5,600 m (6,100 yd), the armor-piercing shell could penetrate 140 mm (5.5 in) of nickel steel armor; when range fell to 4,100 m (13,500 ft), its penetration capabilities increased to 230 mm (9.1 in). The 21 cm caliber would remain the standard for all subsequent armored cruiser designs.

The ships' secondary armament consisted of ten 15 cm (5.9 in) SK L/40 guns, all placed in the sides of the hulls. Three guns were mounted in casemates amidships on either side, with a pair of gun turrets above them. These guns were provided with a total of 1,400 shells, or 140 per gun. These guns fired a 40.0 kg (88.2 lb) projectile at a muzzle velocity of 800 m/s (2,625 ft/s) per second; these shells included armor-piercing, semi-armor-piercing, high-explosive, common, and shrapnel rounds. The guns could elevate to 30°, allowing a maximum range of 13,900 m (15,200 yd).

The ships also carried twelve 8.8 cm SK L/35 guns in C/01 pivot mounts for close-in defense; these were arranged in groups of four in shielded pivot mounts. Four guns were mounted around the forward conning tower, four were located around the rear two funnels amidships, with the last four guns placed on top of the rear superstructure. These guns fired the C/01 semi-armor-piercing 9.8 kg (22 lb) shell at a muzzle velocity of 690 m (2,260 ft) per second; the lighter 7 kg (15.4 lb) high-explosive round was also provided. The guns could elevate to 25° and could engage targets out to 8,000 m (8,700 yd).

The vessels' armament was rounded out by four 45 cm (17.7 in) submerged torpedo tubes. They were mounted in the bow, stern, and on each broadside, and supplied with eleven torpedoes.

=== Armor ===
Generic layout of an armored cruiser's protective scheme of the period; the red lines represent the ship's armor

The steel armor used on the two ships was produced by the Krupp firm using its proprietary process. Armor thickness remained similar in strength to that of Prinz Heinrich, though it was made more comprehensive, the primary improvement being to the upper belt, which was connected to the main-battery barbettes by oblique armored bulkheads. The main belt armor consisted of a layer of teak that was 50 mm (2 in) thick, covered by 100 mm (3.9 in) thick steel plating in the armored citadel, which covered the ships' machinery spaces and ammunition magazines. The belt was reduced to 80 mm (3.1 in) on either ends of the citadel; the bow and stern were unprotected.

The armor deck thickness was also increased compared to Prinz Heinrich. The deck consisted of two basic components: a flat deck that covered much of the hull, and downward sloping sections along the sides that connected to the bottom edge of the belt armor. The flat section of the deck ranged in thickness from 40 mm (1.6 in) to 80 mm. Sloped armor, which ranged in thickness from 50 to 80 mm, provided an additional measure of protection behind the belt. The ships' casemate guns, which were placed above the main belt and fitted with 80 mm gun shields, were protected by 100 mm thick armor plating, as were the 15 cm turret guns. The two 21 cm guns had 150 mm thick sides and 30 mm roofs. The 8.8 cm guns were equipped with 50 mm gun shields.

The forward conning tower was protected by 150 mm (5.9 in) sides and had a 30 mm (1.2 in) thick roof. The rear conning tower was much less thoroughly protected, with only 20 mm (0.79 in) worth of armor protection.

=== Evaluation ===
The design suffered from a number of defects, some of which were common to German armored cruiser designs, but others were repeated in other navies across different ship types. As with Prinz Heinrich (and the follow-on Roon class), the Prinz Adalbert class was inadequately protected. The guns of their secondary battery that were mounted in casemates were situated too low in the hull, and as a result they were frequently washed out in heavy seas (and therefore unusable). This was a common problem in many navies of the time, and not unique to armored cruisers. In addition, none of the Prinz Heinrich, Prinz Adalbert, or Roon classes reached their intended speeds. These failures were primarily the result of their length-to-breadth ratio, which was imposed by the limitations of existing dock facilities in Wilhelmshaven. According to the naval historian Hugh Lyon, "when compared to their British contemporaries they do not show up particularly well, in fact, with the possible exception of the last pair, Scharnhorst and Gneisenau, it is probably true to say that the armored cruisers were Germany's worst designed and least battleworthy ships in service in 1905."

== Ships ==
Construction data
Name	Namesake	Builder	Laid down	Launched	Commissioned
Prinz Adalbert	SMS Prinz Adalbert	Kaiserliche Werft, Kiel	April 1900	22 June 1901	12 January 1904
Friedrich Carl	SMS Friedrich Carl	Blohm & Voss, Hamburg	August 1901	21 June 1902	12 December 1903

== Service history ==
Prinz Adalbert went into service as a gunnery-training vessel for the fleet after her commissioning, while Friedrich Carl served with the reconnaissance squadron of the Heimatflotte (Home Fleet), initially as its flagship. Friedrich Carl also went on foreign cruises during this period, including to escort Kaiser Wilhelm II's yacht Hohenzollern on foreign visits. One of these included the Kaiser's visit to Morocco in 1905 that led to the First Moroccan Crisis. In 1909, with more modern cruisers entering service with the fleet, Friedrich Carl joined her sister ship as a training vessel, being used as a torpedo-training ship. Throughout their prewar careers, the ships participated in extensive fleet training.

=== World War I ===
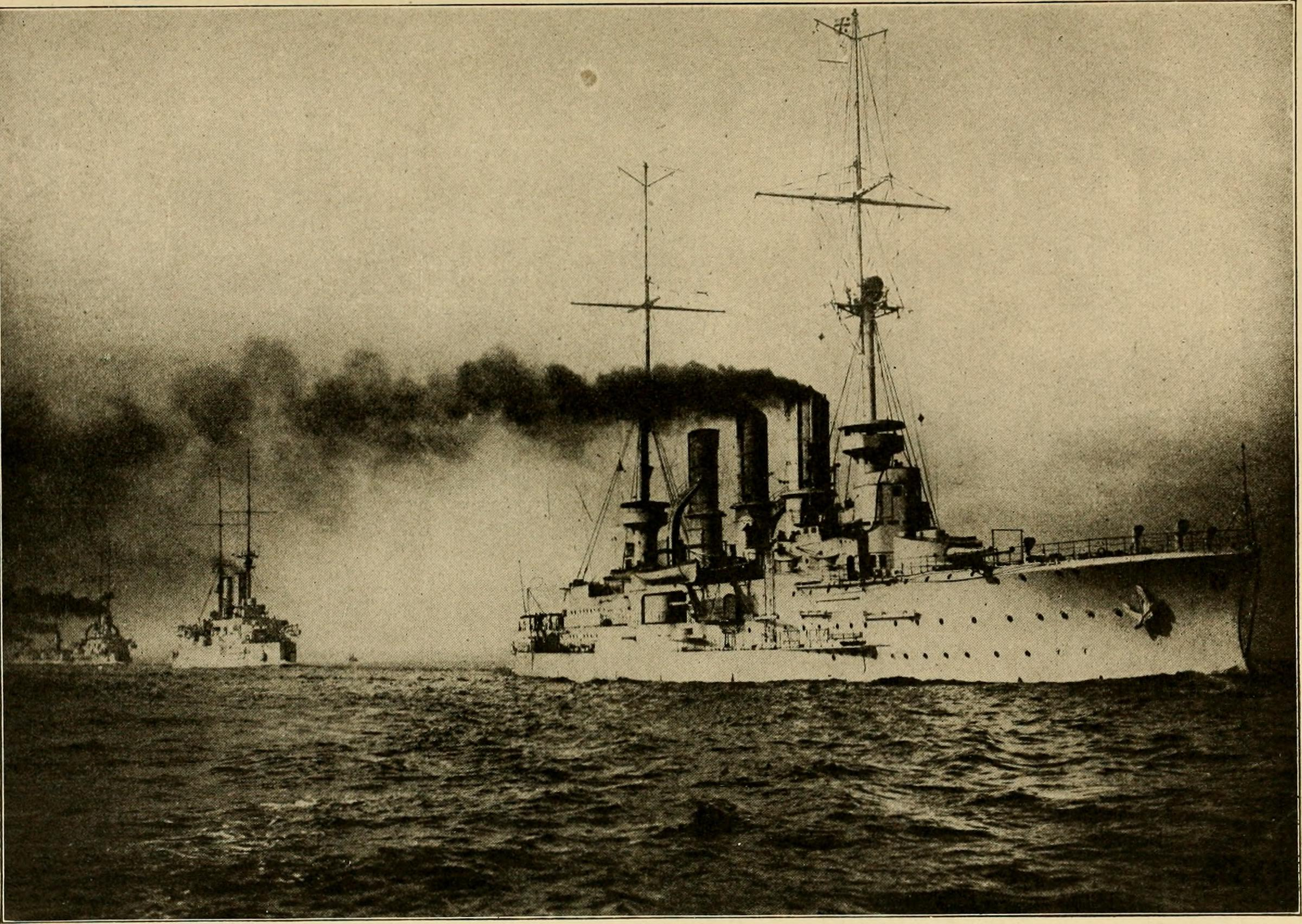
Friedrich Carl leading a line of ships

The two ships were re-mobilized after the outbreak of World War I in August 1914. Prinz Adalbert was initially assigned to the IV Scouting Group, and alternated between the North and Baltic Seas for various operations, including cruising with the fleet during the raid on Yarmouth in early November. Friedrich Carl was sent to the Cruiser Division of the Baltic Sea commanded by KAdm Ehler Behring, where she served as his flagship. The division was based in Neufahrwasser in Danzig. Behring was ordered to attack the Russian port of Libau, which was believed to be a staging area for British submarines. On 17 November, while steaming to Libau, Friedrich Carl struck a pair of Russian naval mines off Memel. The ship's crew managed to keep the cruiser afloat long enough to allow nearby vessels to take off the entire crew before she sank; only seven men were killed in the attack. The remainder of the operation proceeded as planned, however, and several blockships were sunk in the harbor entrance.

After the sinking of Friedrich Carl, Prinz Adalbert was transferred to the Cruiser Division and Behring shifted his flag to the vessel. The ship conducted several operations against Russian forces in the southern Baltic in the first half of 1915, including bombardments of Libau and supporting minelayers around the Gulf of Riga. She ran aground off Steinort in January but was able to free herself. After repairs were completed, she returned to active duty in March. In May, she supported the German Army attack that captured Libau. On 2 July, the ship sortied to reinforce a German minelaying operation that had come under attack by a Russian cruiser flotilla in the central Baltic. While en route with the armored cruiser Prinz Heinrich, Prinz Adalbert was torpedoed by the British submarine E9. The damage was severe, though the cruiser was able to return to Kiel for repairs. Ten men were killed in the attack.

Prinz Adalbert's repairs were completed by September. She took part in a sortie into the Gulf of Finland toward the end of the month that resulted in no action. On 23 October, Prinz Adalbert was steaming some 20 miles west of Libau in company with a pair of destroyers when she was intercepted by the British submarine E8. E8 fired a single torpedo at a range of approximately 1,300 yards (1,200 m), which struck the ship and detonated the ammunition magazine. The explosion destroyed the ship, which sank immediately with the loss of 672 crew. Only three men survived the sinking, which was the greatest single loss of life for the German Baltic naval forces for the duration of the war.
