= SMS S139 (1906) =

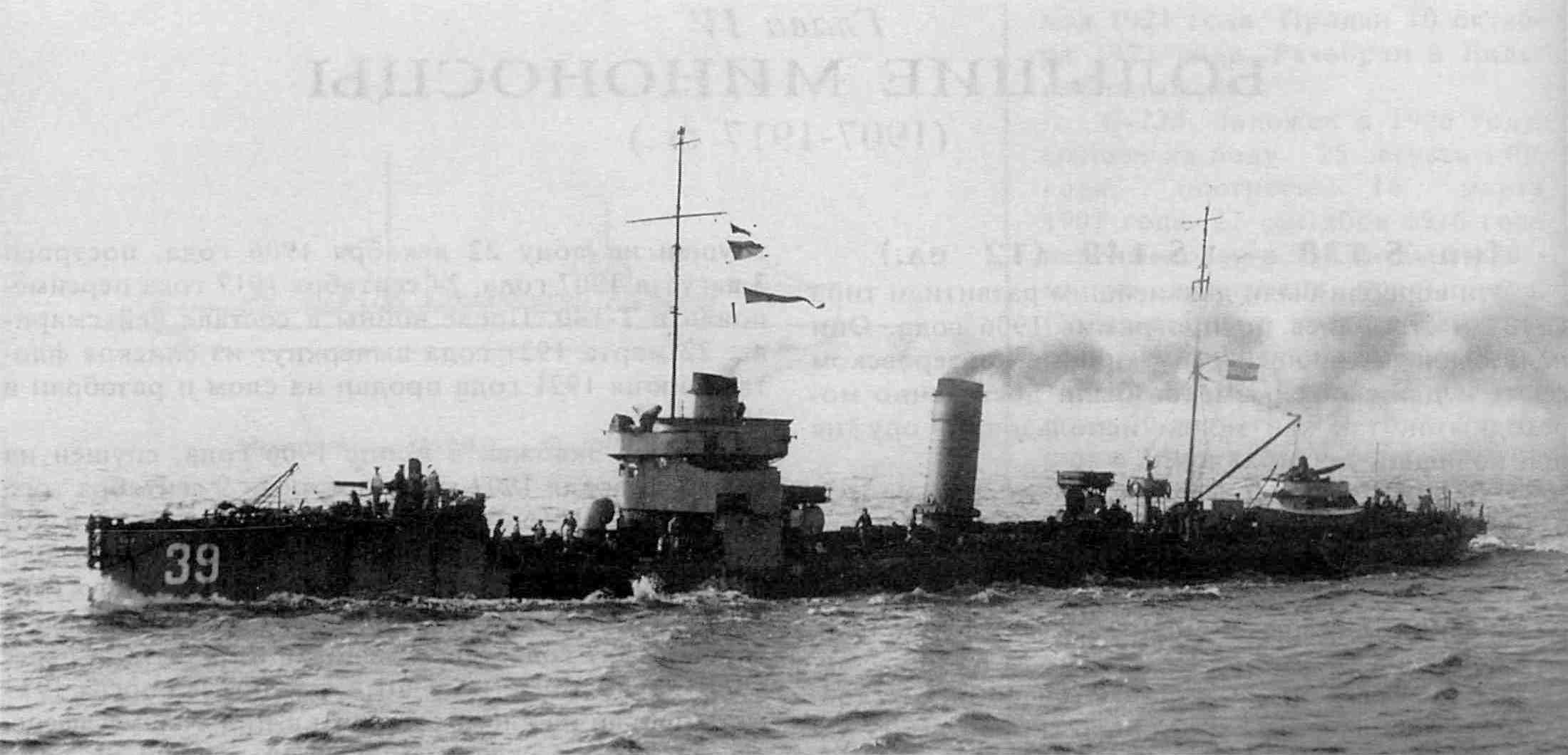
- T139

History

Germany
- Name: SMS S139
- Builder: Schichau-Werke, Elbing
- Launched: 12 November 1906
- Completed: 6 July 1907
- Renamed: T139: 24 September 1917; Pfeil: 3 August 1927
- Fate: Unknown - no records after 1944

General characteristics
- Class & type: S138-class torpedo boat
- Displacement: 533 t (525 long tons) design
- Length: 70.7 m (231 ft 11 in) o/a
- Beam: 7.8 m (25 ft 7 in)
- Draught: 2.75 m (9 ft 0 in)
- Installed power: 11,000 PS (11,000 shp; 8,100 kW)
- Propulsion: 4 × coal fired water-tube boilers; 2 × triple expansion steam engines
- Speed: 30 kn (35 mph; 56 km/h)
- Complement: 80
- Armament: 1 × 8.8 cm gun; 3 × 5.2 cm gun; 3× 45 cm torpedo tubes

SMS S139 (Note: "SMS" stands for "Seiner Majestät Schiff" (transl. His Majesty's Ship)) (Note: The "S" in S139 denoted the shipbuilder who constructed her, in this case Schichau-Werke.) was a S138-class large torpedo boat of the Imperial German Navy. She was built by the Schichau-Werke at Elbing in 1906, launching on July that year.

At the start of the First World War, S139 was part of the German High Seas Fleet, operating in the North Sea, but she soon moved to the Baltic. The ship took part in Operation Albion, the German invasion and occupation of the West Estonian Archipelago in 1917. She was renamed SMS T139 in September 1917. The ship survived the war and was retained by the post war Weimar German Navy. In 1927 she was converted to a control ship for radio-controlled target ships and was renamed Pfeil (arrow). In the Second World War, Pfeil served as a torpedo recovery vessel, but there is no record of the ship after 1944, and her ultimate fate is unknown.

== Design and construction ==
The Imperial German Navy ordered 12 large torpedo boats (Große Torpedoboote) from Schichau-Werke as part of the fiscal year 1906 shipbuilding programme. This 12-ship order, sufficient to equip an entire torpedo-boat flotilla, was a result of a planned increase in the size of the German torpedo forces from 96 to 144 torpedo boats under the 1906 Amendment to the 1900 Naval Act. The 1906 torpedo boats were of similar size and armament to G137, the turbine-engined torpedo boat that was the last of the 1905 programme, and were required to reach a speed of 30 kn (35 mph; 56 km/h).

S139 was 70.7 m (231 ft 11 in) long overall and 70.2 m (230 ft 4 in) between perpendiculars, with a beam of 7.8 m (25 ft 7 in) and a draught of 2.75 m (9 ft 0 in). The ship had a design displacement of 533 t (525 long tons) which increased to 684 t (673 long tons) at deep load. Four coal-fired water-tube boilers fed steam at a pressure of 19.5 atm (287 psi) to 2 three-cylinder triple expansion engines with a total of 11,000 ihp (8,200 kW). This allowed speeds of 30.3 kn (34.9 mph; 56.1 km/h) to be reached during Sea trials. The ships bunkers had a capacity of 194 t, while a further 20 t could be carried on deck. This gave a range of 1,830 nmi (2,110 mi; 3,390 km) at 17 knots (20 mph; 31 km/h) and 390 nmi (450 mi; 720 km) at 24 kn (28 mph; 44 km/h).

S139's as-built armament was a single 8.8 cm (3.5 in) SL L/35 gun (with 100 shells) and three 5.2 cm (2.0 in) L/55 guns (with 150 shells per gun). Three single 45 cm (17.7 in) torpedo tubes were fitted, with a single spare torpedo carried. She was later re-armed, with a second 8.8 cm L/35 gun replacing two of the 5.2 cm guns. The ship had a crew of 3 officers and 77 other ranks, which increased to 93 when being used as a flotilla leader.

S139 was laid down at Schichau's Elbing, Prussia (now Elbląg, Poland) shipyard as yard number 778, was launched on 12 November 1906 and was completed on 6 July 1907.

== Service ==
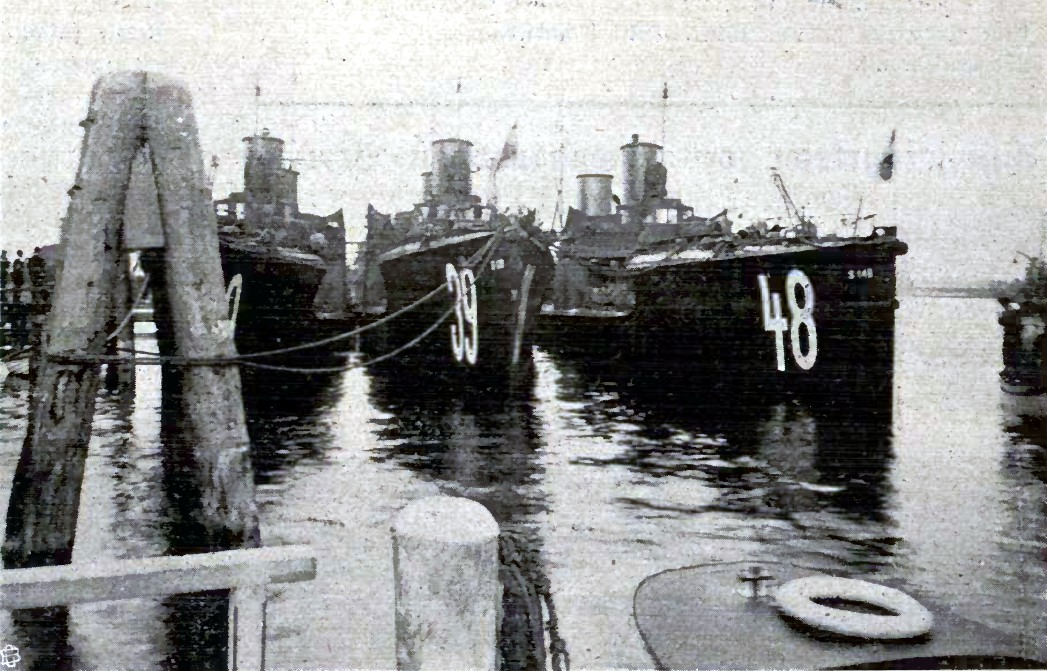
Three torpedo boats, including S139 and S150 at anchor at Travemünde

In 1908, S139 was listed as part of the 3rd torpedo boat half-flotilla, part of the Training Flotilla (Schul-Flottille). In 1909, S139 had moved to the 1st half-flotilla, part of the 1st Training Flotilla. In 1911, S139 was part of the 3rd half-flotilla of the 2nd Torpedo boat Flotilla. S139 and the torpedo boat G172 collided during manoeuvres in May 1911, killing one man. In 1913, G139 had returned to the 3rd half-flotilla of the 2nd Torpedo Boat Flotilla, remaining with that formation in 1914.

=== First World War ===
S139 remained part of the 3rd half-flotilla of the 2nd Torpedo Boat Flotilla, part of the High Seas Fleet, on the outbreak of the First World War. From 3 to 9 September 1914, the German Baltic Fleet, supported by units of the Highs Seas Fleet, carried out a sortie into the Baltic with the intention of luring out the Russian Baltic Fleet out to battle. The 2nd Torpedo boat Flotilla, including S139, took part in this operation. On 6 September, the 3rd half-flotilla, including S139, shelled a lighthouse and radio station on the island of Bogskär (off the coast of Finland), destroying the lighthouse, and capturing the station's crew of five men.

In April 1915, the Baltic torpedo forces were reorganised and strengthened, with old torpedo boats from the 2nd Flotilla transferred as they were replaced by new ships. S139 joined the 20th half-flotilla, part of the newly established 10th Torpedo Boat Flotilla, which operated in the Baltic. On 27 April 1915, the German Army launched an offensive in the Baltic to tie down Russian forces in advance of the start of the Gorlice–Tarnów offensive. On 7 May, German cruisers bombarded Russian positions around Libau (now Liepāja). The torpedo boats S138 and S141 carried out a reconnaissance of the entrances to Libau harbour, with the rest of the 10th Torpedo Boat Flotilla in support. The torpedo boat S128 struck a mine, blowing off the ship's stern and killing 5 men with 6 more wounded. S139 and S129 went to the damaged torpedo boat's assistance, and towed S128 back to Memel (now Klaipėda). The Russians left Libau on the night of 7/8 May.

From 3 June, the Germans launched a major minelaying operation, in which their ships would pass through the Irbe Strait and mine the south entrance to the Moon Sound. The German force was split into several groups, with S139 and S148 accompanying the cruisers Augsburg and Lübeck. The operation encountered heavy Russian opposition, and was abandoned. The seaplane carrier Glyndwr was mined and badly damaged during the return to port, while on 5 June, S139 and S148 were coaling from the collier Dora Hugo Stinnes, with the cruiser Thetis preparing to follow them, when the British submarine E9 attacked. One torpedo was fired at Thetis, but this veered off course and missed the cruiser, while two more were fired at the collier and the two torpedo boats, which hit Dora Hugo Stinnes and S148. S139 and the torpedo boat S130 counter-attacked, but E9 escaped unharmed. Dora Hugo Stinnes sank after 90 minutes, with two killed, while S148 was heavily damaged, with flooding in the forward part of the ship and one man killed. S139 towed S148 back to Libau. On 24–25 June, S139, along with G135, escorted Thetis on a reconnaissance sortie into the North Baltic. On 2 July 1915, a German minelaying mission was intercepted by Russian cruisers in the Battle of Åland Islands. The armoured cruisers Prinz Adalbert and Prinz Heinrich, escorted by S139 and S138, set out in response, but E9 encountered the two cruisers and torpedoed Prinz Adalbert which was damaged but was escorted back to port. On 7 July 1915, S139 collided with the minesweeper depot ship Indianola in fog off Stolpmünde (now Ustka, Poland), and was badly damaged, but managed to reach Kiel without assistance.

By May 1916, S139 had moved to the 19th half-flotilla, still part of the 10th Torpedo Boat Flotilla operating in the Baltic. S139 was renamed T139 on 24 September 1917, in order to release her name for a new S139, a 1916 Mobilisation Type torpedo boat. T139, now part of the 7th torpedo-boat half-flotilla, took part in Operation Albion, the German invasion and occupation of the West Estonian Archipelago in October 1917. On 16 October, T139 landed a Pioneer company and its equipment at Orissaare on Ösel. On 7 March 1918, T139 took part in German landings in the Åland islands. T139 remained part of the 7th half-flotilla, part of the 4th Torpedo Boat Flotilla, and tasked with patrolling the Øresund, at the end of the war.

=== Post-war service ===
After the end of the war, T139 was retained by the Weimar Republic's navy, the Reichsmarine, and when the Treaty of Versailles limited Germany's torpedo forces to 12 destroyers and 12 torpedo boats in active service, with a further 4 of each type in reserve, T139 was retained as an active torpedo boat. (Note: While the Versailles Treaty distinguished between destroyers and torpedo boats, with the more modern vessels being declared as destroyers by Germany for treaty purposes, in actual use the Reichsmarine did not distinguish between the two, and designated all as torpedo boats.) T139 was modified with a larger bridge and funnel caps fitted while being refitted for Reichsmarine service, while the 8.8 cm guns were replaced by more powerful 8.8 cm SK L/45 naval guns. T139 recommissioned on 10 September 1920 joining the 1st Torpedo Boat Flotilla, but went into reserve on 20 January 1924, returning to active service on 3 March 1925. The construction of the new Type 23 and Type 24 torpedo boats allowed the older vessels to be phased out, and S139 was stricken on 3 August 1927, but she was not discarded, and instead was disarmed and converted to a control vessel for the radio-target vessel (and former battleship) Zähringen and as a high speed tug, taking the new name Pfeil. On 28 September 1937, Pfeil was converted to a torpedo-recovery vessel.

Pfeil remained in service in 1944, being attached to the 24th U-boat Flotilla, but there is no record of the ship's history after that or her final fate.

== Bibliography ==
- Chesneau, Roger; Kolesnik, Eugene M., eds. (1979). Conway's All The World's Fighting Ships 1860–1905. London: Conway Maritime Press. ISBN 0-85177-133-5.
- Dodson, Aidan (2019). "Beyond the Kaiser: The IGN's Destroyers and Torpedo Boats After 1918". In Jordan, John (ed.). Warship 2019. Oxford, UK: Osprey Publishing. pp. 129–144. ISBN 978-1-4728-3595-6.
- Firle, Rudolph (1921). Der Krieg in der Ostsee: Erster Band: Von Kriegsbeginn bis Mitte März 1915. Der Krieg zur See: 1914–1918 (in German). Berlin: Verlag von E. S. Mittler und Sohn.
- Fock, Harald (1981). Schwarze Gesellen: Band 2: Zerstörer bis 1914 (in German). Herford, Germany: Koelers Verlagsgesellschaft mBH. ISBN 3-7822-0206-6.
- Fock, Harald (1989). Z-Vor! Internationale Entwicklung und Kriegseinsätze von Zerstörern und Torpedobooten 1914 bis 1939 (in German). Herford, Germany: Koehlers Verlagsgesellschaft mBH. ISBN 3-7822-0207-4.
- von Gagern, Ernst (1962). Der Krieg in der Ostsee: Dritter Band: Von Anfang 1916 bis zum Kriegsende (in German). Frankfurt: Verlag von E.S. Mittler & Sohn.
- Gardiner, Robert; Gray, Randal, eds. (1985). Conway's All The World's Fighting Ships 1906–1921. London: Conway Maritime Press. ISBN 0-85177-245-5.
- Gröner, Erich; Jung, Dieter; Maass, Martin (1983). Die deutschen Kriegsschiffe 1815–1945: Band 2: Torpedoboote, Zerstörer, Schnellboote, Minensuchboote, Minenräumboote (in German). Koblenz: Bernard & Graef Verlag. ISBN 3-7637-4801-6.
- Halpern, Paul G. (1994). A Naval History of World War I. London: UCL Press. ISBN 1-85728-498-4.
- Hildebrand, Hans H.; Röhr, Albert; Steinmetz, Hans-Otto (1980). Die Deutchen Kreigschiffe: Biographen - ein Spiegel der Marinegeschichte von 1815 bis zur Gegenwart: Band 2 (in German). Herford, Germany: Koehlers Verlagsgesellschaft mBH. ISBN 3-7822-0210-4.
- Hildebrand, Hans H.; Röhr, Albert; Steinmetz, Hans-Otto (1983). Die Deutchen Kreigschiffe: Biographen - ein Spiegel der Marinegeschichte von 1815 bis zur Gegenwart: Band 7 (in German). Herford, Germany: Koehlers Verlagsgesellschaft mBH. ISBN 3-7822-0267-8.
- Rollmann, Heinrich (1929). Der Krieg in der Ostsee: Zwieter Band: Das Kriegjahr 1915. Der Krieg zur See: 1914–1918 (in German). Berlin: Verlag von E.S. Mittler & Sohn.
- Stoelzel, Albert (1930). Ehrenrangliste der Kaiserlich Deutschen Marine 1914–1918 (in German). Berlin: Thormann & Goetsch.
