= SMS S138 =

SMS S138 refers to two torpedo boats built for the German Kaiserliche Marine (Imperial Navy):

- SMS S138 (1906), a S138-class torpedo boat launched on 22 September 1906, was renamed T138 in September 1917. Sank by mine on 7 July 1918.
- SMS S138 (1917), a 1916 Mobilisation Type torpedo boat launched on 22 April 1918. Scuttled on 21 June 1919 at Scapa Flow. Salvaged in 1925 and scrapped.
