= SMS S138 (1906) =

History

Germany
- Name: SMS S138
- Builder: Schichau-Werke, Elbing
- Launched: 22 September 1906
- Completed: 7 May 1907
- Renamed: T138: 24 September 1917
- Fate: Mined and sunk 7 July 1918

General characteristics
- Class & type: S138-class torpedo boat
- Displacement: 533 t (525 long tons) design
- Length: 70.7 m (231 ft 11 in) o/a
- Beam: 7.8 m (25 ft 7 in)
- Draught: 2.75 m (9 ft 0 in)
- Installed power: 11,000 PS (11,000 shp; 8,100 kW)
- Propulsion: 4 × coal fired water-tube boilers; 2 × triple expansion steam engines
- Speed: 30 kn (35 mph; 56 km/h)
- Complement: 80
- Armament: 1 × 8.8 cm gun; 3 × 5.2 cm gun; 3× 45 cm torpedo tubes

SMS S138 (Note: "SMS" stands for "Seiner Majestät Schiff" (transl. His Majesty's Ship)) (Note: The "S" in S138 denoted the shipbuilder who constructed her, in this case Schichau-Werke.) was a S138-class large torpedo boat of the Imperial German Navy. She was built by the Schichau-Werke at Elbing in 1906, launching on September that year and completing in May 1907.

During the First World War, S138 served in the North Sea and Baltic Sea in the early part of the war, before leading a unit of patrol boats and being employed on escort duties. The ship was renamed T138 in September 1917. T138, along with the torpedo boat T172 was sunk by a mine on 7 July 1918 while escorting a German submarine.

== Design and construction ==
The Imperial German Navy ordered 12 large torpedo boats (Große Torpedoboote) from Schichau-Werke as part of the fiscal year 1906 shipbuilding programme. This 12-ship order, sufficient to equip an entire torpedo-boat flotilla, was a result of a planned increase in the size of the German torpedo forces from 96 to 144 torpedo boats under the 1906 Amendment to the 1900 Naval Act. The 1906 torpedo boats were of similar size and armament to G137, the turbine-engined torpedo boat that was the last of the 1905 programme, and were required to reach a speed of 30 kn (35 mph; 56 km/h).

S138 was 70.7 m (231 ft 11 in) long overall and 70.2 m (230 ft 4 in) between perpendiculars, with a beam of 7.8 m (25 ft 7 in) and a draught of 2.75 m (9 ft 0 in). The ship had a design displacement of 533 t (525 long tons) which increased to 684 t (673 long tons) at deep load. Four coal-fired water-tube boilers fed steam at a pressure of 19.5 atm (287 psi) to 2 three-cylinder triple expansion engines with a total of 11,000 ihp (8,200 kW). This allowed speeds of 30.3 kn (34.9 mph; 56.1 km/h) to be reached during Sea trials. The ships bunkers had a capacity of 194 t, while a further 20 t could be carried on deck. This gave a range of 1,830 nmi (2,110 mi; 3,390 km) at 17 knots (20 mph; 31 km/h) and 390 nmi (450 mi; 720 km) at 24 kn (28 mph; 44 km/h).

S138's as-built armament was a single 8.8 cm (3.5 in) SL L/35 gun (with 100 shells) and three 5.2 cm (2.0 in) L/55 guns (with 150 shells per gun). Three single 45 cm (17.7 in) torpedo tubes were fitted, with a single spare torpedo carried. She was later re-armed, with a second 8.8 cm L/35 gun replacing two of the 5.2 cm guns. The ship had a crew of 3 officers and 77 other ranks, which increased to 93 when being used as a flotilla leader.

S138 was laid down at Schichau's Elbing, Prussia (now Elbląg, Poland) shipyard as yard number 777, was launched on 22 September 1906 and was completed on 7 May 1907.

== Service ==
In 1908, S138 was listed as leader of the 3rd torpedo boat half-flotilla, part of the Training Flotilla (Schul-Flottille). In 1910, S138 was listed as part of the 1st torpedo boat half-flotilla of the 1st Torpedo Boat Flotilla. She remained part of the 1st half-flotilla, which was now in reserve, in 1911.

=== First World War ===
In August 1914, after the outbreak of the First World War, S138 was listed as being part of the 3rd half-flotilla of the 2nd Torpedo Boat Flotilla, part of the High Seas Fleet. From 3 to 9 September 1914, the German Baltic Fleet, supported by units of the Highs Seas Fleet, carried out a sortie into the Baltic with the intention of luring out the Russian Baltic Fleet out to battle. The 2nd Torpedo boat Flotilla, including S138, took part in this operation, and on 6 September, S138, together with S139, S140, S141, S142 and 149, shelled a lighthouse and radio station on the island of Bogskär (off the coast of Finland), destroying the lighthouse, and capturing the station's crew of five men. On 21 November 1914, S138 spotted a surfaced submarine just south of the Amrun Bank.

In April 1915, the Baltic torpedo forces were reorganised and strengthened, with old torpedo boats from the 2nd Flotilla transferred as they were replaced by new ships. S138 joined the 20th half-flotilla, part of the newly established 10th Torpedo Boat Flotilla, which operated in the Baltic. From 13 to 15 April 1915, S138, together with the torpedo boats G132 and S141, and the cruisers Prinz Adalbert, Lübeck and Thetis, escorted the minelayer Deutschland on a minelaying mission in the Gulf of Finland. On 27 April 1915, the German Army launched an offensive in the Baltic to tie down Russian forces in advance of the start of the Gorlice–Tarnów offensive. On 7 May, German cruisers bombarded Russian positions around Libau (now Liepāja). S138 and the torpedo boat S141 carried out a reconnaissance of the entrances to Libau harbour, with the rest of the 10th Torpedo Boat Flotilla in support, while the torpedo boat S128 was mined and damaged during the operation. The Russians left Libau on the night of 7/8 May. On 25 May, S138 and S142, which had just escorted the cruiser Augsburg into Libau after a minelaying mission, were sent out to search for a missing aircraft, which was later found by a patrol boat.

From 3 June 1915, the Germans launched a major minelaying operation, in which their ships would pass through the Irbe Strait and mine the south entrance to the Moon Sound. The German force was split into several groups, with S138, S141, S142 and S149 escorting the cruisers Prinz Adalbert, Prinz Heinrich and Roon. The operation encountered heavy Russian opposition, and was abandoned, with the collier Dora Hugo Stinnes sunk and the torpedo boat S148 damaged by torpedoes from the British submarine E9 and the seaplane carrier Glyndwr damaged by a mine. On the night of 18/19 June, S138 led five torpedo boats of the 19th half-flotilla (S126, S130, S131, S147 and S149) into the Moon Sound to lay mines. On 2 July 1915, a German minelaying mission was intercepted by Russian cruisers in the Battle of Åland Islands. The armoured cruisers Prinz Adalbert and Prinz Heinrich, escorted by S139 and S138, set out in response, but E9 encountered the two cruisers and torpedoed Prinz Adalbert. The cruiser was damaged but remained afloat, and was escorted to safety by S139, while S138 attempted to attack the submarine, firing at E9's periscope, and attempting to ram. In August 1915 the German Baltic Fleet, supported by a large portion of the High Seas Fleet, launched a major operation against Russian naval forces in the Gulf of Riga in support of the advance of German troops. It was planned to enter the Gulf via the Irben Strait, defeating any Russian naval forces and mining the entrance to Moon Sound. On 8 August, a Russian flying boat that had just attacked Roon force-landed nearby and S138 captured the aircraft's crew, preventing them from destroying the flying boat.

By May 1916, S138 had transferred to the Vorpstenboot (outpost or patrol boat) flotilla protecting the mouth of the River Ems, serving as leader to the unit's 1st half-flotilla of nine patrol boats. On 24 September 1917, S138 was renamed T138, to free her old name for a new S138, a 1916 Mobilisation Type torpedo boat. In early 1918, owing to the need to escort German U-boats through minefields in the German Bight, the coastal patrol and minesweeping forces of the German forces were reorganised to form large escort flotillas. T136 joined one of these escort flotillas, being part of the 3rd escort half-flotilla of the 1st Escort Flotilla in April 1918.

On 6 July 1918, the 2nd escort half-flotilla, including T138, set out to escort the submarine U-55 through the minefields. In the early morning of 7 July 1918, the escort was about to turn back when a mine detonated in the wake of T148. Shortly afterwards, T138 struck a mine and broke in two, sinking within a few minutes, killing 32 of her crew. The torpedo boat T172, which was following T138, also struck a mine and after the survivors of her crew were rescued, was scuttled.

== Bibliography ==
- Chesneau, Roger; Kolesnik, Eugene M., eds. (1979). Conway's All The World's Fighting Ships 1860–1905. London: Conway Maritime Press. ISBN 0-85177-133-5.
- Firle, Rudolph (1921). Der Krieg in der Ostsee: Erster Band: Von Kriegsbeginn bis Mitte März 1915. Der Krieg zur See: 1914–1918 (in German). Berlin: Verlag von E. S. Mittler und Sohn.
- Fock, Harald (1981). Schwarze Gesellen: Band 2: Zerstörer bis 1914 (in German). Herford, Germany: Koelers Verlagsgesellschaft mBH. ISBN 3-7822-0206-6.
- Fock, Harald (1989). Z-Vor! Internationale Entwicklung und Kriegseinsätze von Zerstörern und Torpedobooten 1914 bis 1939 (in German). Herford, Germany: Koehlers Verlagsgesellschaft mBH. ISBN 3-7822-0207-4.
- Gardiner, Robert; Gray, Randal, eds. (1985). Conway's All The World's Fighting Ships 1906–1921. London: Conway Maritime Press. ISBN 0-85177-245-5.
- Gladisch, Walter, ed. (1965). Der Krieg in der Nordsee: Band 7: Vom Sommer 1917 bis zum Kriegsende 1918. Frankfurt: Verlag E.S. Mittler & Sohn.
- Gröner, Erich; Jung, Dieter; Maass, Martin (1983). Die deutschen Kriegsschiffe 1815–1945: Band 2: Torpedoboote, Zerstörer, Schnellboote, Minensuchboote, Minenräumboote (in German). Koblenz: Bernard & Graef Verlag. ISBN 3-7637-4801-6.
- Groos, O. (1923). Der Krieg in der Nordsee: Dritter Band: Von Ende November 1914 bis Unfang Februar 1915. Der Krieg zur See: 1914–1918. Berlin: Verlag von E. S. Mittler und Sohn – via National Library of Estonia.
- Halpern, Paul G. (1994). A Naval History of World War I. London: UCL Press. ISBN 1-85728-498-4.
- Rollmann, Heinrich (1929). Der Krieg in der Ostsee: Zwieter Band: Das Kriegjahr 1915. Der Krieg zur See: 1914–1918 (in German). Berlin: Verlag von E.S. Mittler & Sohn.
- Stoelzel, Albert (1930). Ehrenrangliste der Kaiserlich Deutschen Marine 1914–1918 (in German). Berlin: Thormann & Goetsch.
