= SMS Fürst Bismarck =

Armored cruiser of the German Imperial Navy

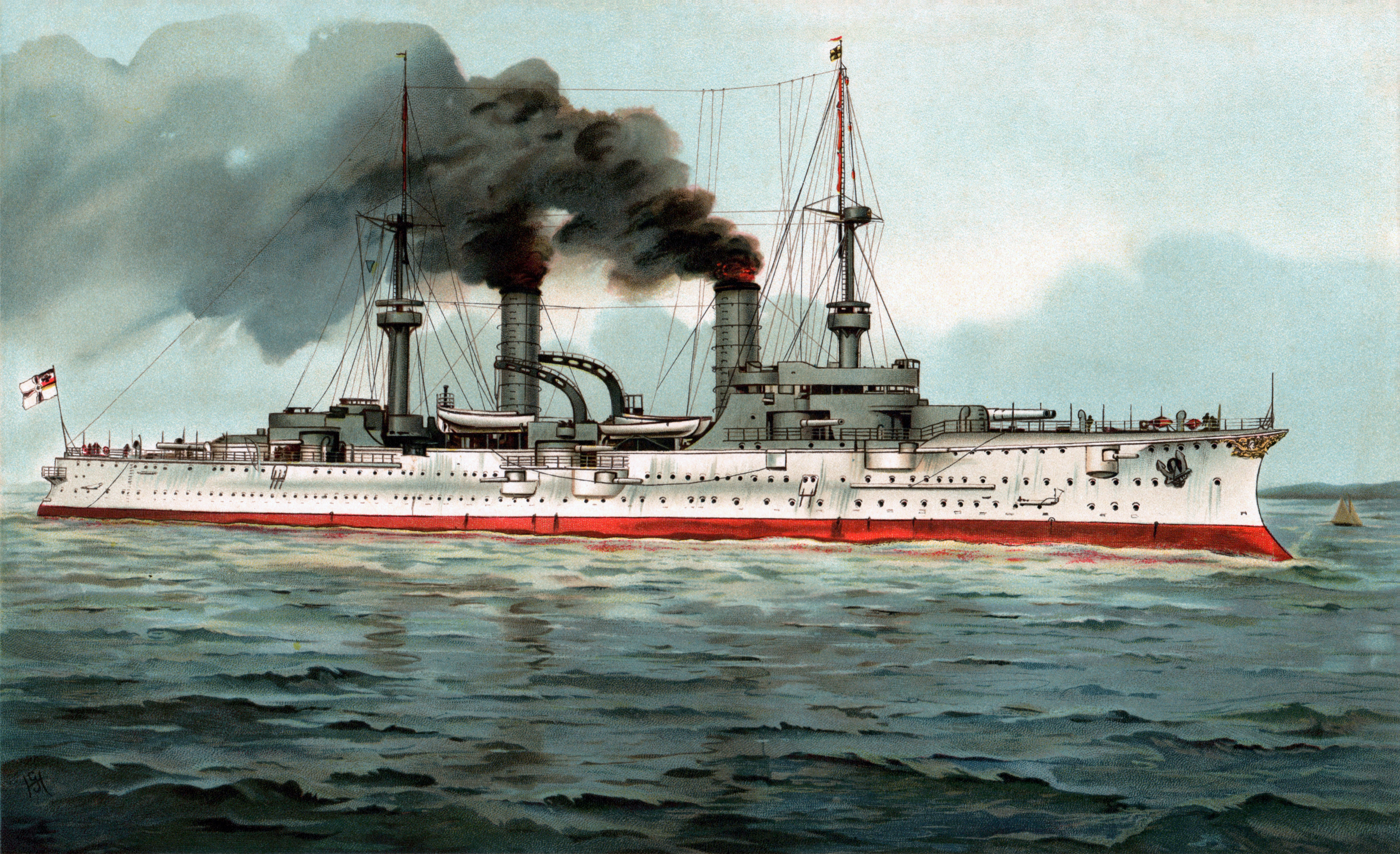
- A 1902 lithograph of Fürst Bismarck

Class overview
- Preceded by: Victoria Louise class
- Succeeded by: Prinz Heinrich

History

German Empire
- Name: Fürst Bismarck
- Namesake: Otto von Bismarck
- Builder: Kaiserliche Werft, Kiel
- Laid down: 1 April 1896
- Launched: 25 September 1897
- Commissioned: 1 April 1900
- Decommissioned: 31 December 1918
- Stricken: 17 June 1919
- Fate: Scrapped in 1919–1920

General characteristics
- Type: Armored cruiser
- Displacement: Normal: 10,690 t (10,520 long tons); Full load: 11,461 t (11,280 long tons)
- Length: 127 m (416 ft 8 in)
- Beam: 20.40 m (66 ft 11 in)
- Draft: 7.80 m (25 ft 7 in)
- Installed power: 13,500 PS (13,300 ihp); 4 × water-tube boilers; 8 × fire-tube boilers
- Propulsion: 3 × triple-expansion engines; 3 × screw propellers
- Speed: 18.7 knots (34.6 km/h; 21.5 mph)
- Range: 4,560 nmi (8,450 km) at 10 knots (19 km/h; 12 mph); 3,230 nmi (5,980 km) at 12 knots (22 km/h; 14 mph)
- Complement: 36 officers; 585 men
- Armament: 4 × 24 cm (9.4 in) SK L/40 guns; 12 × 15 cm (5.9 in) SK L/40 guns; 10 × 8.8 cm (3.5 in) SK L/30 guns; 6 × 45 cm (17.7 in) torpedo tubes
- Armor: Belt: 20 cm (7.9 in); Turrets: 20 cm (7.9 in); Deck: 3 cm (1.2 in)

SMS Fürst Bismarck (Prince Bismarck) (Note: "SMS" stands for "Seiner Majestät Schiff", or "His Majesty's Ship" in German.) was Germany's first armored cruiser, built for the Kaiserliche Marine (Imperial Navy) in the late 1890s. Ordered in response to widespread foreign adoption of the ship type, the Germans built Fürst Bismarck to serve abroad in the German colonial empire and as a scout for the main fleet in home waters. The ship's design emerged from a failed 1890s design competition that was heavily influenced by the new emperor, Kaiser Wilhelm II. Though that failed to produce a workable design, further efforts resulted in the development of Fürst Bismarck, which was in many respects a cruiser version of the contemporary Kaiser Friedrich III class of battleships. Fürst Bismarck carried the same main battery of four 24 cm (9.4 in) guns as the battleships, but was faster due to a longer, lighter hull and more powerful engines.

The Germans worked to finish construction on the ship as early as possible after the outbreak of the 1899 Boxer Uprising in China; Fürst Bismarck arrived there in late 1900, becoming the flagship of the East Asia Squadron. Most of the initial fighting had taken place by the time the ship arrived, but she participated in a blockade of the Yangtze as part of the campaign to defeat the Boxers. From 1901 to 1909, Fürst Bismarck remained on station as the squadron flagship; most of her time was spent on routine patrols in the region, training exercises with other ships of the squadron, and visits to foreign ports. In 1904, during the Russo-Japanese War, a pair of damaged Russian warships sheltered at the German naval base at Qingdao, so Fürst Bismarck and other units of the squadron had to intern them for the rest of the conflict.

By 1909, Fürst Bismarck was in poor condition and needed to return home for extensive repairs. She was recalled in April 1909, and the new armored cruiser Scharnhorst was sent to relieve her. After arriving in Germany, Fürst Bismarck was drydocked in 1910 for repairs and a modernization that lasted into late 1914, by which time World War I had started. The ship thereafter served as a training vessel, as she was no longer suitable to serve in a combat capacity. Over the course of 1915 and 1916, she was disarmed before returning to training duties. Following Germany's defeat in late 1918, Fürst Bismarck was struck from the naval register in June 1919 and shortly thereafter sold to ship breakers. Demolition was completed the following year.

== Background ==
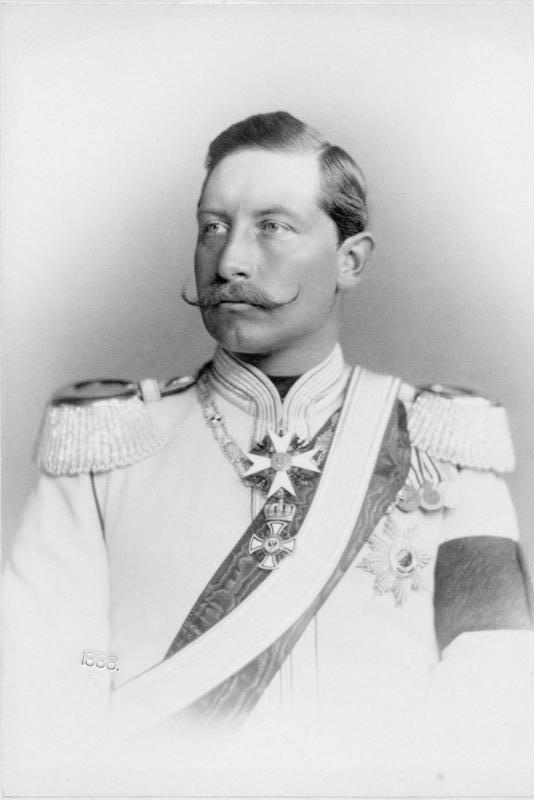
Kaiser Wilhelm II, whose rise to the throne in 1888 paved the way for a dramatic expansion of the German fleet

From the 1870s to early 1880s, the German Kaiserliche Marine (Imperial Navy) opposed building armored cruisers such as the Russian General-Admiral. But in the mid-1880s, following the rise of General Leo von Caprivi to the position of Chief of the Imperial Admiralty, opinions among senior leaders began to change. Soon after his appointment, Caprivi established a commission to examine the question of future warship construction. As part of the process, Caprivi requested several experimental designs from Alfred Dietrich, the chief constructor for the German fleet, to compare estimated costs from the various proposals. Among several battleship and coastal defense ship proposals, Dietrich prepared designs for two armored cruisers, (Note: Armored cruisers were vessels that generally possessed side armor intended to serve on foreign stations, as a fast wing of a fleet of battleships, or to attack or protect merchant shipping. Side armor differentiated them from large protected cruisers that only incorporated an armor deck for defense against enemy fire.) which displaced 6,430 and 7,500 metric tons (6,330 and 7,380 long tons; 7,090 and 8,270 short tons), respectively. They carried a main battery of eight 24 cm (9 in) guns and had identical armor protection; the chief differences being the greater size and increased engine power of the latter, which gave it a half knot advantage in speed.

Political events quickly overtook Caprivi's program, as 1888 became the Year of the Three Emperors: with the deaths of Kaiser Wilhelm I and his successor Kaiser Friedrich III, Kaiser Wilhelm II ascended the throne. The new monarch quickly replaced Caprivi with Alexander von Monts. Monts opted to build four Brandenburg-class battleships, as the new Kaiser sought to modernize the fleet. Following Monts' untimely death in early 1889, Wilhelm II reorganized the naval high command, and Admiral Karl Eduard Heusner became the State Secretary of the Reichsmarineamt (Naval Office), which oversaw administrative matters including warship construction. By 1890, Heusner had been replaced in turn by Admiral Friedrich von Hollmann, who believed that Germany could not compete with the dominant British Royal Navy. He therefore opted for a strategy based on a defense force centered on small coastal defense ships and flotillas of torpedo boats, coupled with a fleet of cruisers to protect the German colonial empire and German economic interests abroad.

=== 1891–1893 design competition ===
Frustrated by Hollmann's preference for smaller, cheaper 2nd- and 3rd-class cruisers, Konteradmiral (KAdm—Rear Admiral) Hans von Koester wrote him a letter in January 1891 outlining the weaknesses of these vessels. Koester singled out the recently completed Irene class of protected cruisers, which were too slow to serve as fleet scouts and too weakly armed to take part in a fleet battle. Hollmann was soon convinced, particularly after Wilhelm II intervened in the matter, and in April he began to solicit tenders from German shipbuilders. General requirements were as follows: dimensions restricted to existing port facilities; speed of at least 17 knots (31 km/h; 20 mph); main battery of four 24 cm guns; belt armor with a thickness of 250 mm (10 in). Hollmann and Admiral Max von der Goltz (the head of the Oberkommando der Marine, the Navy High Command) argued over particular aspects of the new ship. Hollmann soon revised the speed figure up to 19 knots (35 km/h; 22 mph) and set displacement to be between 8,000 and 9,000 t (7,900 and 8,900 long tons; 8,800 and 9,900 short tons) to assuage Goltz's concerns about speed.

By August 1891, five private shipyards and the three imperial yards in Wilhelmshaven, Kiel, and Danzig had all been selected to participate in the design competition. Wilhelm II, who was famously obsessed with the fleet, also participated semi-covertly through his naval cabinet, which submitted proposals on his behalf. (Note: Wilhelm was not a trained naval engineer, despite his enthusiasm for the topic, but he also could not be directly criticized for unworkable designs, so the compromise of having the cabinet submit them, with the assistance of Gustav von Senden-Bibran and the naval constructor Hugo Schunke.) Hollmann expected the process to move quickly, and he planned to order three armored cruisers for the 1892–1893 construction year. In April 1892, he ordered submissions to be entered by 1 May, but the deadline was unrealistic and he was forced to delay to 1 October. In total, nine designs were submitted, which were evaluated in June and July 1893; the naval command decided that none of the proposed vessels were acceptable, and that none would be built. From Hollmann's perspective, it was just as well, since funding for the project he had conceived beginning in 1891 had been repeatedly delayed, and by 1893, the Army was in the midst of a major expansion that absorbed funds that might otherwise have been requested by the Navy.

While the design submission process was still underway in April 1893, Koester issued an order for a marine architect student to create a proposal for an armored cruiser of about 6,500 t (6,400 long tons; 7,200 short tons) displacement, which was close to the size of the French cruiser Dupuy de Lôme. Koester sought to evaluate whether the larger vessel of Hollmann's design contest or a smaller ship along French lines was preferable. The student, Hermann Wellenkamp, concluded that an armored cruiser limited to 6,500 tons would require significant compromises in armor protection and structural strength. As a result, the concept of a smaller armored cruiser was abandoned for future projects.

In the aftermath of the failed 1891–1893 design competition, Wilhelm made several attempts to revise his design, all of which failed to produce a workable ship. Hollmann projected a new armored cruiser, designated Ersatz Leipzig to replace the old screw corvette of that name, for the 1894–1895 estimates. (Note: German warships were ordered under provisional names. Additions to the fleet were given a single letter; ships intended to replace older or lost vessels were ordered as "Ersatz (name of the ship to be replaced)".) By that time, opinions in the Reichstag (Imperial Diet), which had historically been against naval spending, had begun to warm. The budgetary board approved the request to include a new battleship—Ersatz Preussen—and Ersatz Leipzig, but by the time the proposals advanced to the Reichstag itself, support for the large, expensive cruiser had collapsed and only the new battleship was approved. The defeat gave Dietrich and the design department more time to work out details in the design. Another attempt would be made for Ersatz Leipzig in the 1895–1896 construction year, but the first members of the Victoria Louise class of protected cruisers were laid down in 1895 instead.

== Design ==
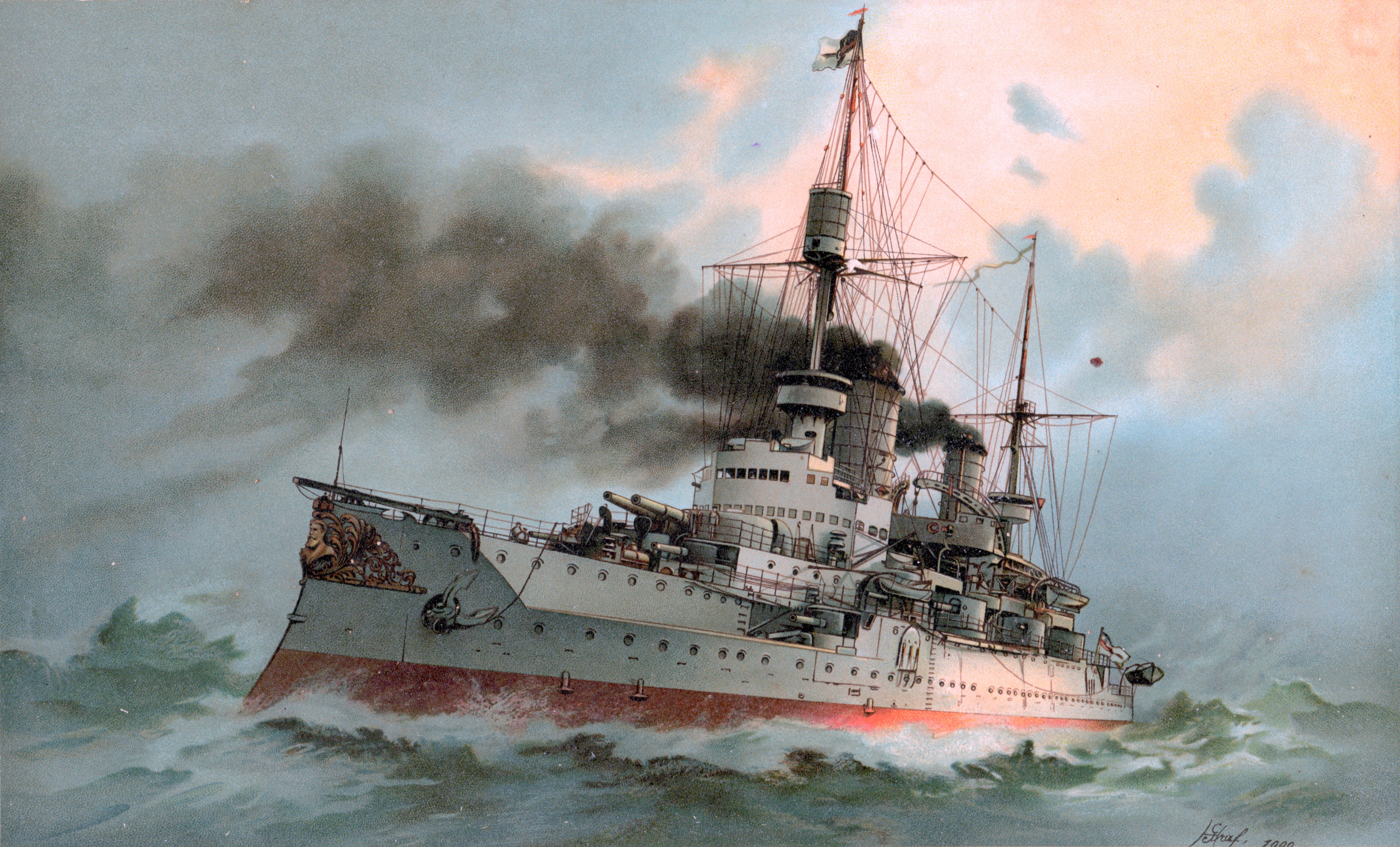
Lithograph of SMS Kaiser Friedrich III, which heavily influenced the design for Fürst Bismarck

Records of the early design history of what would become Fürst Bismarck are fragmentary; according to the historian Dirk Nottelmann, it can be assumed that the basic parameters of the 1891–1893 competition were used as a starting point in 1894. To complicate matters, in June 1894, then-Konteradmiral Alfred von Tirpitz published his "Dienstschrift No. IX" memo that laid out his vision for the future development of the German fleet. Tirpitz's plan included prescriptions for an armored cruiser that emphasized the ship's role as a scout for the battle fleet, and thus called for a top speed of 20 knots (37 km/h; 23 mph) and a large number of 15 cm (5.9 in) quick-firing guns. These priorities contrasted sharply with the requirements laid out by Hollmann, who had originally requested designs with a top speed of 17 knots and a mixed armament of 24 cm and 10.5 cm (4.1 in) guns.

The earliest surviving design proposal was designated VIIc, and it generally followed Hollmann's requirements including the armament, though it had a top speed of 20 knots, in line with Tirpitz's thinking. This proposal was completed on 1 November 1894 and secured the approval of Wilhelm II four days later. The naval leadership, prompted by the Kaiser, next evaluated whether the 10.5 cm guns could be replaced by an equal number of 15 cm weapons. The design staff concluded that weight savings elsewhere would be necessary to maintain speed on the prescribed hull, and the simplest solution was to reduce the caliber of the main battery guns from 24 cm to 21 cm (8.3 in). This proposal was designated VIII, but it was soon rejected because of a still prohibitive increase in overall weight. Six further concepts were proposed, with 21 or 24 cm main guns, and varying numbers of 15 cm guns. Further discussions suggested the possibility of a pair of single 28 cm (11 in) guns or significant reductions in armor thicknesses to reduce weight. Consideration was also given to reducing Ersatz Leipzig by about 1,000 tons and incorporating improvements into the last three Victoria Louise-class cruisers about to be laid down, which would have converted them into armored cruisers. Ultimately, none of these ideas influenced the final design.

On 29 April 1895, Hollmann convened a meeting of the relevant departments within the naval command to settle on the final characteristics of the new cruiser. Over the course of the following three days, the representatives ironed out details, many of which were inspired by the contemporary Kaiser Friedrich III-class battleships, including the type and arrangement of the gun armament, the composition of the superstructure, and the configuration of the propulsion system. A new proposal, VIId, was prepared on 24 May, and the Kaiser approved the concept three days later. The new ship, to be named Fürst Bismarck, would be more than a knot faster than her battleship counterparts, which was accomplished by a 5-meter (16 ft) longer hull, a propulsion system rated 510 metric horsepower (500 ihp) higher, and reduced armor protection to save weight. Some details were still undetermined, as VIId omitted copper sheathing for the hull; Tirpitz and his supporters opposed the installation of sheathing, as it was unnecessary in home waters and added weight. Hollmann's faction insisted on it, since they sought to use the cruiser on foreign stations where frequent hull cleaning was impossible. Ultimately, Wilhelm II intervened on 10 June and ordered the installation of sheathing.

The introduction of sheathing necessitated further revisions to keep weight from increasing. The ship was widened and the secondary battery was rearranged to reduce the armor needed to protect the guns. This version, which reused the designation VIII, was approved on 13 September, but it quickly became clear that the hull was not strong enough for the proposed weights. To avoid needing to reduce armor thicknesses, the hull was lengthened from 117 to 120 m (384 to 394 ft) between perpendiculars so that the reinforced hull structure would not prohibitively increase the draft. Dietrich carried out further detail work into early 1896, presenting his finalized design in a memorandum published on 16 April. By that time, the Reichstag had approved construction of the ship, which had already begun on 1 April.

The new ship was significantly larger than the Victoria Louise-class cruisers, but like those vessels, Fürst Bismarck was intended to serve abroad in the colonial empire. Fürst Bismarck marked a significant advance in German cruiser power, and this was reflected in her designation as a 1st-class cruiser, the first vessel of the type to be built for the German fleet. Despite heavy political opposition, the new ship was approved by the Reichstag and construction began in 1896. By the late 1890s, while Fürst Bismarck was still under construction, Hollmann was replaced by Tirpitz, who favored the construction of a powerful fleet consisting of numerous battleships; Fürst Bismarck therefore adopted a second role, to act as a scout for the battle fleet. She would nevertheless spend most of her career abroad.

=== General characteristics ===
Plan and profile drawing of Fürst Bismarck (Note: This is an early version of the final design, and thus has several significant differences between it and the ship as completed. These include taller funnels and removal of the bow sponsons for the 8.8 cm guns and anchors. In addition, the foremast is depicted with two fighting tops, when it only had one such position.)

Fürst Bismarck was 125.7 m (412 ft) at the waterline, with an overall length of 127 m (417 ft) and a beam of 20.40 m (66.9 ft). She had a draft of 7.80 m (25.6 ft) forward and 8.46 m (27.8 ft) aft. She displaced 10,690 metric tons (10,520 long tons) as designed and 11,461 metric tons (11,280 long tons) at full load. Fürst Bismarck was a very good sea-boat, and was highly responsive to commands from the helm; steering was controlled by a single balanced rudder. However, the ship suffered from serious roll problems and heavy vibration at higher speeds. She also lost significant speed, up to 1.5 knots (2.8 km/h; 1.7 mph), in a head sea when the waves reached 3 m (9.8 ft) in height. Her metacentric height was 0.72 m (2 ft 4 in).

The ship was of transverse and longitudinal steel frame construction; the hull was a single layer of wooden planks covered by a Muntz metal sheath that extended up to 0.95 m (3.1 ft) above the waterline. The stem and the stern were made of bronze. The ship had thirteen watertight compartments and a double bottom that ran for fifty-nine percent of the length of the hull. As was common for warships of the period, she had a pronounced ram bow. Fürst Bismarck had a significant tumblehome shape.

Her superstructure included a large conning tower forward with a bridge atop it, along with a smaller structure further aft with a secondary conning tower. A raised walkway connected the forward and aft structures. The ship was fitted with a pair of heavy military masts that carried a platform for searchlights above fighting tops for some of her lighter guns. The masts were also fitted with topgallants for signaling purposes, which could be retracted to permit the ship to pass under the bridges over the Kaiser Wilhelm Canal.

Fürst Bismarck had a crew that consisted of 36 officers and 585 enlisted men. She accommodated an additional 14 officers and 62 enlisted men while serving as a flagship of a squadron. She carried a number of small boats, including one picket boat, a launch, two pinnaces, two cutters, two yawls, and three dinghies. Two large cranes were fitted to move the boats to and from the water.

=== Propulsion system ===
Fürst Bismarck was propelled by three vertical four-cylinder, triple-expansion engines, which drove three three-bladed screw propellers. The center propeller was 4.40 m (14.4 ft) in diameter, while the two outer screws were slightly larger, at 4.80 m (15.7 ft) in diameter. Steam for the engines was provided by twelve coal-fired boilers. Of these, four were Thornycroft–Schultz boilers of the water-tube type—which had been built under license by Germaniawerft; they were a variation on the standard Thornycroft boiler, with improvements to the flow of the combustion system that resulted in a different arrangement. (Note: These boilers were first developed for the Kaiser Friedrich III-class battleships, and would become the standard boiler for most future German warships, being referred to as the "Navy boiler" or "Marine boiler".) The remaining eight were cylindrical fire-tube boilers of the Scotch type. The Thornycroft–Schultz boilers had two fire boxes apiece, for a total of eight, while the cylindrical boilers each had four fire boxes, for a total of 32. The boilers were vented through a pair of large funnels.

The engines were rated to produce 13,500 PS (13,300 ihp) (Note: "PS" is the abbreviation for metric horsepower) for a top speed of 18.7 knots (34.6 km/h; 21.5 mph). On trials, the engines were pushed to 13,622 PS (13,436 ihp), but still only provided a top speed of 18.7 knots (34.6 km/h; 21.5 mph). Fürst Bismarck carried 900 t (890 long tons; 990 short tons) of coal normally and up to 1,400 t (1,400 long tons; 1,500 short tons) using all available storage. She had a cruising range of 3,230 nautical miles (5,980 km; 3,720 mi) at a speed of 12 knots (22 km/h; 14 mph), which increased to 4,560 nmi (8,450 km; 5,250 mi) if speed was reduced slightly to 10 knots (19 km/h; 12 mph). Electrical power was supplied by five generators that provided 325 kilowatts at 110 volts.

=== Armament ===
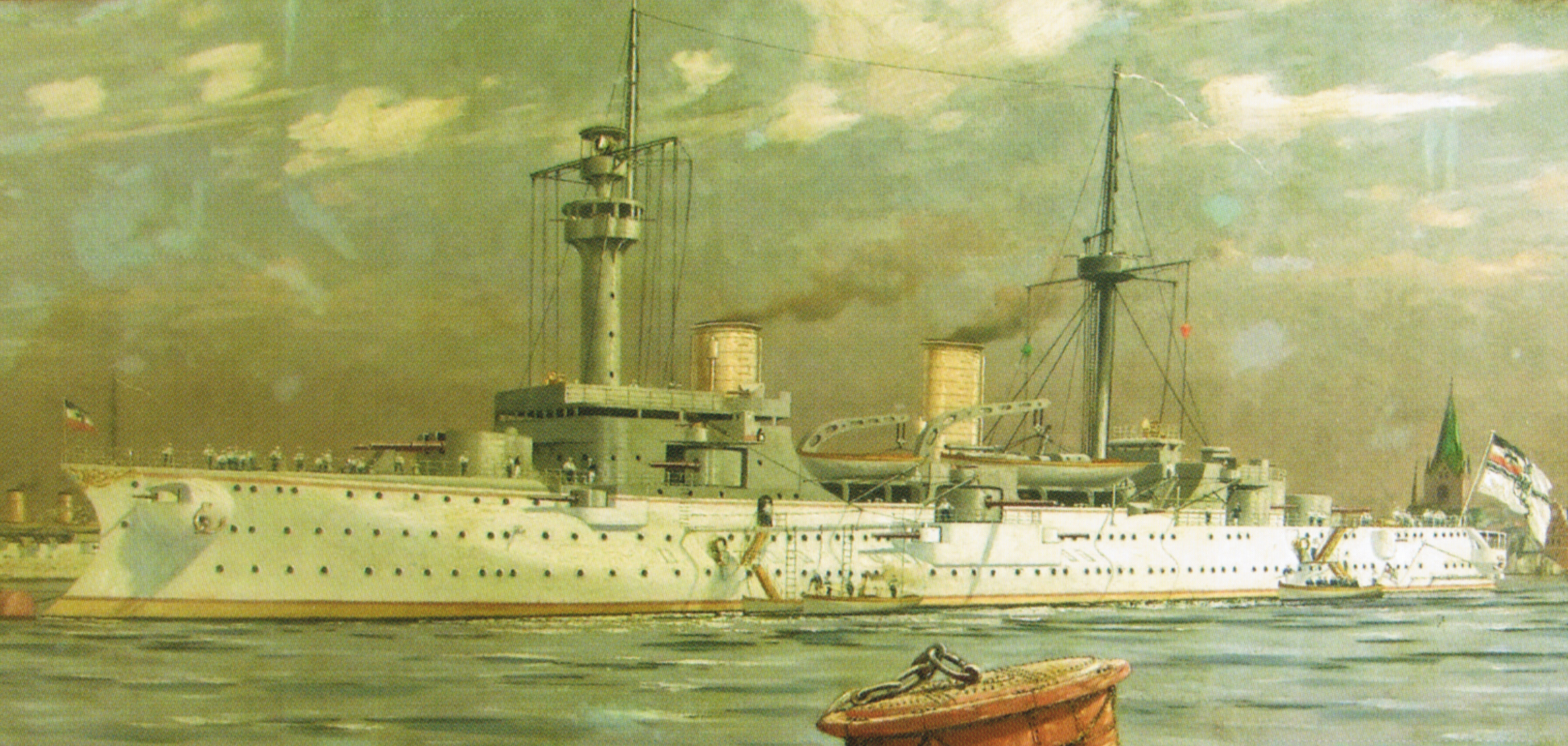
A Fritz Stoltenberg painting of Fürst Bismarck shortly after her commissioning (Note: Stoltenberg's depiction shows the ship as originally planned, with the large, bulbous sponson for the forward-most 8.8 cm gun and anchor. According to Nottelmann, Stoltenberg "presumably based [it] on the first dockyard model.")

Fürst Bismarck's primary armament consisted of a battery of four 24 cm SK L/40 guns in twin-gun turrets, (Note: In Imperial German Navy gun nomenclature, "SK" (Schnelladekanone) denotes that the gun is quick firing, while the L/40 denotes the length of the gun. In this case, the L/40 gun is 40 caliber, meaning that the gun is 40 times as long as it is in diameter.) one fore and one aft of the central superstructure. The guns were mounted in C/98 turrets, which allowed elevation to 30° and depression to −5°. At maximum elevation, the guns could hit targets out to 16,900 meters (18,500 yd). The guns fired 140-kilogram (310 lb) shells at a muzzle velocity of 835 meters per second (2,740 ft/s). The ship stored 312 rounds, for a total of 78 shells per gun. The gun had a rate of fire of one shot every 42 seconds. The ammunition hoists that brought shells and propellant up from the magazines were not located within the rotating turret structure. Ammunition handling inside the turret was done manually, and required two transfers, first from the ammunition hoists to the turret turntable, and then from the turntable to the loading platform.

The secondary armament consisted of twelve 15 cm SK L/40 quick-firing guns. Of these, eight were in MPL type casemates in the hull; the remainder were in turrets. These guns fired armor-piercing shells at a rate of 4 to 5 per minute. The ships carried 120 shells per gun, for a total of 2,160 rounds total. The guns could depress to −7 degrees and elevate to 20 degrees, for a maximum range of 13,700 m (14,990 yd). The shells weighed 51 kg (112 lb) and were fired at a muzzle velocity of 735 m/s (2,410 ft/s). The guns were manually elevated and trained.

For defense against torpedo boats, the ship also carried ten 8.8 cm (3.5 in) SK L/30 guns in a combination of individual casemates and pivot mounts. These guns fired 7.04 kg (15.5 lb) shell at a muzzle velocity of 590 m/s (1,900 ft/s). Their rate of fire was approximately 15 shells per minute; the guns could engage targets out to 6,890 m (7,530 yd). The gun mounts were manually operated. These were supplemented with ten 3.7 cm (1.5 in) Maxim autocannon.

Six 45 cm (17.7 in) torpedo tubes were also fitted, with a total of 16 torpedoes. One tube was fitted to a swivel mount on the stern of the ship, four were submerged on the broadside (two per side of the ship), and the sixth was placed in the bow, also submerged.

=== Armor ===
Fürst Bismarck was protected with Krupp armor. The armor belt was 20 cm (7.9 in) thick in the central portion of the ship, and tapered down to 10 cm (3.9 in) towards either end of the ship. Set behind the armored belt were 10 cm (3.9 in) thick shields for critical areas of the ship. The main armored deck was 3 cm (1.2 in) thick on the flat, central portion; toward the sides of the ship, the deck curved downward to connect to the bottom edge of the belt. The sloped sides were increased to 5 cm (2.0 in) thick. Above the deck, cofferdams filled with cork were installed to improve resistance to flooding. The forward conning tower had 20 cm-thick sides and a 4 cm (1.6 in) thick roof, while the aft conning tower had 10 cm sides and a 3 cm roof. The main battery turret sides were 20 cm thick and the roofs were 4 cm thick; the roof was canted downward to reduce the height of the turret face, and thus reduce the weight of the turrets. The 15 cm turrets had 10 cm sides and 7 cm (2.8 in) gun shields. The casemated guns had 10 cm shields.

== Service history ==
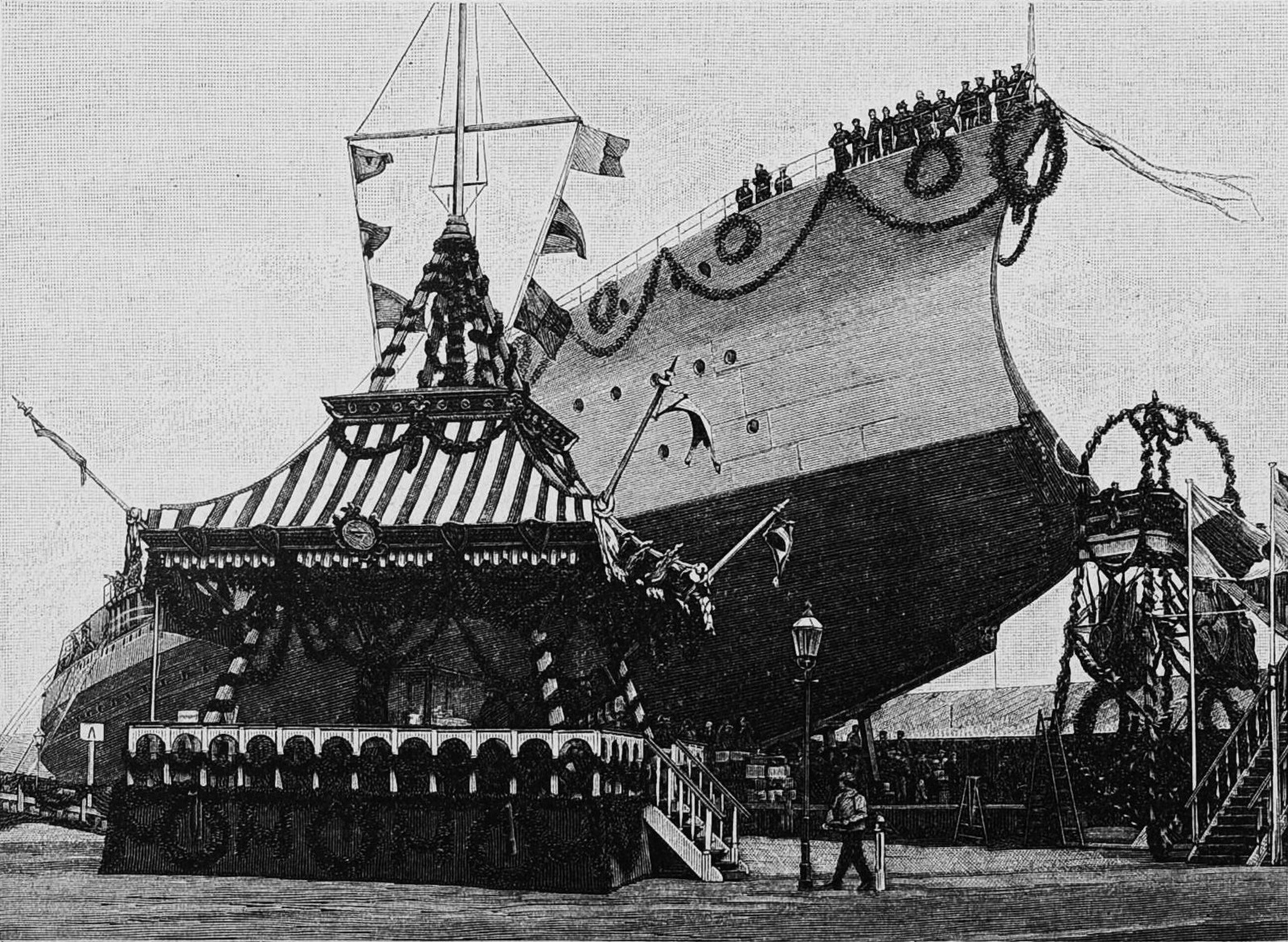
Artist's depiction of the ceremony

Photograph by Arthur Renard

The German Navy awarded the contract for Fürst Bismarck to the Kaiserliche Werft (Imperial Shipyard) in Kiel, and her keel was laid down on 1 April 1896. Coincidentally, that was the 81st birthday of the ship's namesake, Otto von Bismarck. Fürst Bismarck's completed hull was launched on 25 September 1897, where she was christened after Bismarck by Sybille von Bismarck, a daughter-in-law of the namesake. Tirpitz, who was now head of the Reichsmarineamt, gave a speech at the launching ceremony. While the shipyard was completing the fitting-out work for the new armored cruiser on 2 March 1900, the ironclad Sachsen slightly damaged Fürst Bismarck's in an accidental collision. The incident delayed the start of Fürst Bismarck's sea trials until 19 March, while still in dockyard hands. The ship was formally commissioned on 1 April, under the command of Kapitän zur See (KzS—Captain at Sea) Heinrich von Moltke. A second round of trials began on 26 April and continued into June. However, they were terminated after the Boxer Uprising in Qing China worsened and the German Navy determined that its East Asia Squadron needed reinforcements. The initial trials revealed the need for alterations to the ship, but these could not be completed due to the crisis.

Accordingly, on 30 June the ship left Kiel for East Asia, stopping to refuel at Gibraltar, Port Said, and Port Tewfik, the latter two located at both ends of the Suez Canal. In Port Said, she met the gunboat Tiger, which was also sailing to the Far East; the two vessels cruised together for a few days. While passing through the Red Sea, 41 members of her crew suffered from heat-related illness. (Note: Dirk Nottelmann states that the incident "does not shed a truly positive light on the design criteria for a vessel destined to operate in the topics".) Fürst Bismarck stopped in Perim at the southern end of the Red Sea and then crossed the Indian Ocean to Colombo, Ceylon, before proceeding to Singapore.

=== East Asia Squadron ===
==== Boxer Uprising ====
Illustration of Fürst Bismarck

In Singapore on 4 August, the ship received orders to escort the troop ships Frankfurt and Wittekind to Qingdao, the capital of the German Kiautschou Bay Leased Territory in China. The three ships arrived there on 13 August, and four days later, Vizeadmiral (VAdm—Vice Admiral) Emil Felix von Bendemann, the commander of the East Asia Squadron, transferred his flag from the protected cruiser Hertha to Fürst Bismarck. At the time, in addition to Hertha, the squadron consisted of the protected cruisers Hansa, Kaiserin Augusta, and Irene and the unprotected cruisers Gefion and Seeadler, the latter having arrived in the region just days before Fürst Bismarck. Not long after Fürst Bismarck reached Hong Kong, the Detached Division, which consisted of the four pre-dreadnought battleships of the Brandenburg class and the aviso Hela arrived with additional troop ships. The squadron was further reinforced over the following month with the cruisers Geier, Schwalbe, and Bussard, the gunboats Luchs and Tiger, the torpedo boats S90, S91, and S92, and the hospital ship Gera. German forces contributed 24 warships and 17,000 soldiers to the Eight Nation Alliance, which assembled 250 warships and 70,000 soldiers in total to combat the Boxers. An agreement with Russia saw the German Generalfeldmarshall (Field Marshal) Alfred von Waldersee placed in command of the multinational force. (Note: United States forces in the alliance could not legally come under foreign command, and French forces refused to due to political reasons. Nevertheless, Waldersee maintained good relations with US and French commanders in the field and the forces collaborated effectively during the campaign.)

Bendemann decided to implement a blockade of the Yangtze, and so went there with Fürst Bismarck, Gefion, Irene, and the gunboat Iltis, as well as the ships of the Detached Division, though he sent the battleship Wörth to cover the landing of troops at Taku. Landing parties from the ships went ashore in Shanghai to protect Europeans there. Bendemann sent Seeadler and Schwalbe up the Yangtze to protect German, Austro-Hungarian, and Belgian nationals upriver, Bussard to Amoy, and Luchs and S91 to Canton. Bendemann based his flagship in Shanghai, and on 25 September, Hertha arrived with the new German ambassador to China, Alfons Mumm von Schwarzenstein to meet with Bendemann before proceeding on to Beijing. By this time, Allied forces had seized Beicang at the mouth of the Hai River, but the port frequently froze over in the winter, so additional harbors were necessary to adequately supply the forces fighting ashore. Bendemann therefore took most of his fleet to attack the ports of Shanhaiguan and Qinhuangdao, since they had rail connections to Taku and Beijing. Bendemann issued an ultimatum to surrender to the Chinese defenders of the cities, both of which accepted, allowing the Alliance to take both cities without a fight. On 5 October, Fürst Bismarck steamed to Taku, where she joined Hertha and Hela and the battleships Brandenburg and Kurfürst Friedrich Wilhelm. Beginning in late October, the naval forces of the Eight Nation Alliance concentrated on the mouth of the Yangtze. Britain and Germany both suspected the other of attempting to secure a permanent occupation of the area, though both suspicions proved to be false. In November, Fürst Bismarck went to Nagasaki, Japan, for engine maintenance, temporarily transferring Bendemann to Kaiserin Augusta while she was away for repairs.

By February 1901, the fighting had decreased to the point that the ships of the East Asia Squadron could resume the normal routine of individual and squadron training exercises. In May, Seeadler was detached to Yap in the Caroline Islands, and in June, Hansa carried KAdm Hermann Kirchhoff to Sydney and Melbourne, Australia. Also in June, the Detached Division, Irene, and Gefion returned to Germany. The following month, the East Asia Squadron returned to its normal peacetime footing. Fürst Bismarck visited Japanese ports with Geier, S91, and S92 in mid-1901, and in September, she and S91 visited Port Arthur in Russian Dalian before returning to Japanese waters in October. Another shipyard period in Nagasaki followed, which included repairs to her frequently-leaky stern. By this time, the Chinese government had signed the Boxer Protocol on 7 September, formally ending the conflict. The experience of projecting significant military power over such a great distance proved to be invaluable to the German army and navy and it made particularly clear the importance of logistics. Accordingly, a maritime transport department was created in the Reichsmarineamt (Imperial Navy Office) in 1902 under Carl Derzewski.

==== 1902–1905 ====
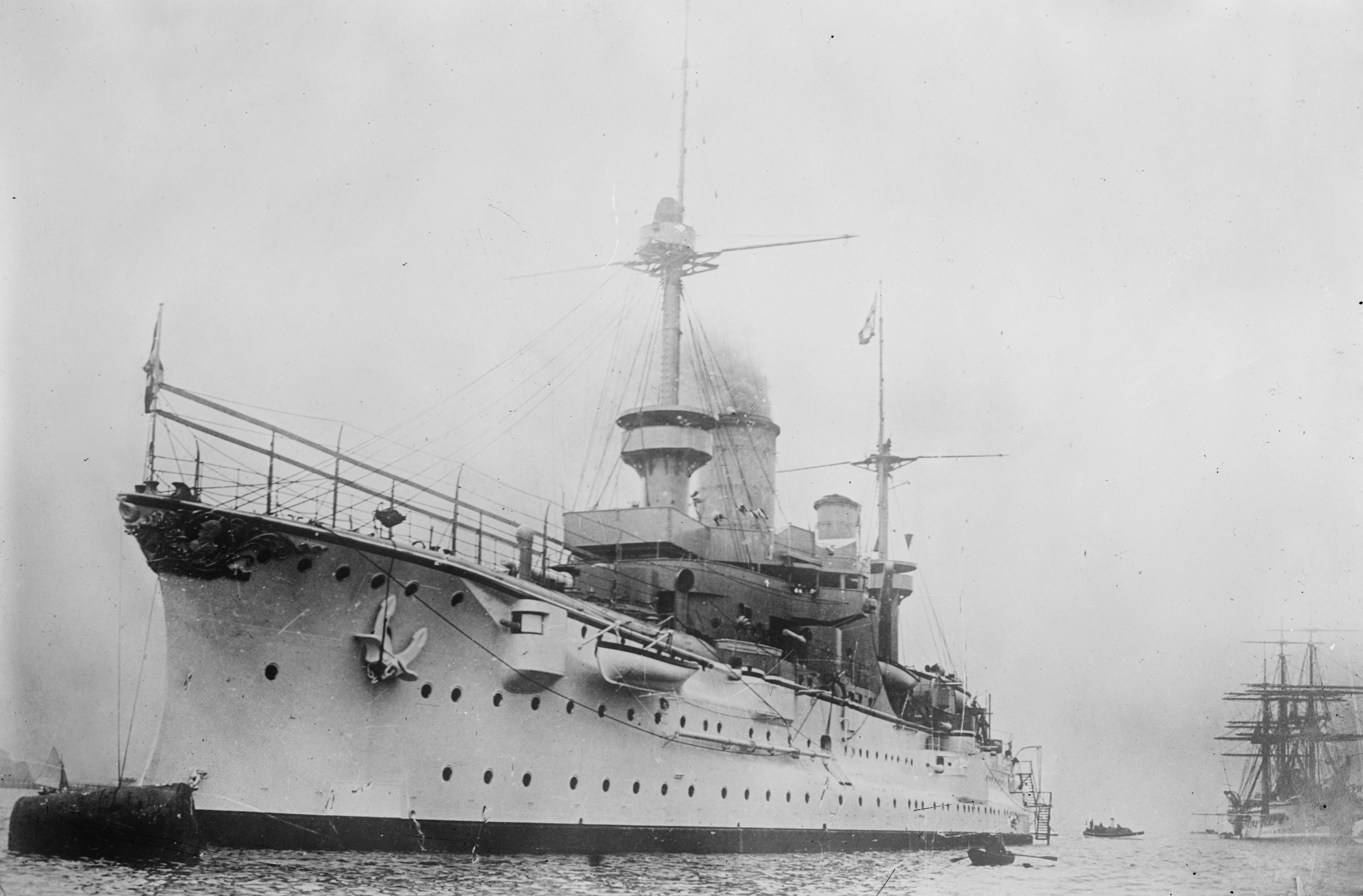
Fürst Bismarck in port at some point during her career

Fürst Bismarck completed repairs in Nagasaki on 15 January 1902 and in early February she rendezvoused with Hertha and Bussard in Singapore. There, Bendemann returned to the ship, though days later on 15 February, he turned command of the squadron over to VAdm Richard Geissler. Later that month, the light cruiser Thetis joined the squadron; further changes to the composition of the squadron followed shortly thereafter, with Kaiserin Augusta, S91, and S92 returning to Germany in February and March. In April, Schwalbe, Geier, and Luchs went to Ningbo to protect Europeans from unrest in the city while Fürst Bismarck and the rest of the squadron toured East Asian ports, ranging from Japan to the Dutch East Indies. During this period, they also conducted various training exercises and alternated visits to Qingdao and Japan for periodic maintenance. Schwalbe returned to Germany in September, though her place was taken by Geier. On 25 December, Kaiser Wilhelm II awarded the Schießpreis (Shooting Prize) for excellent gunnery in the East Asia Squadron to Fürst Bismarck.

In early 1903, Fürst Bismarck anchored off the mouth of the Yangtze with Hansa and Thetis, remaining there until mid-March before proceeding to Qingdao. She remained there until late April, when the squadron conducted training exercises through May, during which Fürst Bismarck again won the Schießpreis. The ship visited Japan in company with Bussard, where Geissler and his staff were received by Emperor Meiji. The two ships then made a visit to the Russian Pacific Fleet, based in Vladivostok, in early August. On 15 November, KAdm Curt von Prittwitz und Gaffron replaced Geissler as the squadron commander, after which Fürst Bismarck returned to Nagasaki for another overhaul in December.

The year 1904 began with exercises and visits to ports in the region. By this time, tensions between Russia and Japan over their competing interests in Korea had risen considerably, so on 7 January the Admiralstab (Admiralty Staff) instructed Prittwitz und Gaffron to order his ships to observe the strictest neutrality toward both countries. Over the course of 20–23 January, Hansa evacuated German and Austro-Hungarian citizens from Port Arthur and Dalian. Japan severed diplomatic relations with Russia on 5 February and attacked the Russian fleet in a surprise nighttime attack on 8/9 February, the Battle of Port Arthur, without having declared war. On 12 February, Hansa returned to Port Arthur to remove the last of the civilians from the city, and Thetis was sent to Chemulpo to do the same on 21–22 February. After the Battle of the Yellow Sea on 10 August, several damaged Russian ships sought refuge in Qingdao, including the battleship Tsesarevich and the cruiser Novik, where they were interned for the remainder of the Russo-Japanese War. For the rest of the war, Fürst Bismarck and the East Asia Squadron were primarily occupied with enforcing the internment of the ships and destroying Russian naval mines that threatened German shipping.

During the war, the squadron continued its normal training routine, and Fürst Bismarck won the Schießpreis again that year. She, Hertha, and Seeadler were present in Shanghai for the opening of a German club in the city. In early 1905, riots in China forced most of the squadron to remain in Chinese ports until March. Prittwitz und Gaffron recalled his ships to Qingdao when the Russian Second Pacific Squadron approached the area; following the Battle of Tsushima, where the Russian squadron was annihilated, the German vessels resumed training activities. Later in the year, both Seeadler and Thetis were sent to German East Africa to suppress a rebellion against German rule. By August, a floating dry dock had been completed in Qingdao, allowing the East Asia Squadron to repair its ships itself; Fürst Bismarck underwent repairs there in October. On 11 November, KAdm Alfred Breusing relieved Prittwitz und Gaffron as commander of the squadron, and in December embarked on a tour of the southern portion of the East Asia Station, though the cruise had to be cut short due to unrest in Shanghai that necessitated Fürst Bismarck's presence there. The ship sent a landing party ashore, along with men from the gunboats Jaguar, Tiger, and Vaterland. The men patrolled the city center and protected the German consulate, but did not take any active role in the unrest.

==== 1906–1908 ====
Sketch of Fürst Bismarck underway

In January 1906, Fürst Bismarck began a tour of the Dutch East Indies, after which she went to Hong Kong via North Borneo in late February. She remained there for almost a month, departing on 23 March to meet the rest of the squadron, which by then could be withdrawn from Shanghai. Fürst Bismarck and Hansa, the only major warships assigned to the squadron by that time, visited Japanese ports in May. On 28 May, Fürst Bismarck went to Taku, where Breusing and his staff traveled overland to Beijing, the first German naval officers to visit the Guangxu Emperor and Empress Dowager Cixi after the Boxer Rebellion. Hansa began the voyage back to Germany on 4 July, and on 9 August, the light cruiser Niobe arrived to join the squadron. On 19 November, the light cruiser Leipzig arrived to further strengthen the squadron. Fürst Bismarck and Tiger went on another tour of the Dutch East Indies and Japan in early 1907. On 13 May, KAdm Carl von Coerper arrived to replace Breusing; he began his tenure as squadron commander by boarding Tiger for a cruise into the Yangtze to familiarize himself with German economic interests in the area. After returning to Fürst Bismarck, he visited Japan in company with Niobe. During the squadron maneuvers that year, Fürst Bismarck won the Schießpreis for a fourth time.

The light cruiser Arcona joined the squadron on 23 October, finally bringing the strength of the unit back to its prescribed four cruisers. In January 1908, Fürst Bismarck steamed to Siam, where she was visited by the King of Siam. Also in 1908, during a visit to Japan, Fürst Bismarck hosted Admiral Tōgō Heihachirō, the Japanese victor of the Battle of Tsushima. The rest of the year passed uneventfully for Fürst Bismarck, and in early 1909 she received orders to return to Germany for repairs. By that time, the ship was in poor condition, though her inadequacy and deteriorating state had already been reported home in late 1906, but there was a shortage of armored cruisers with which to replace her. It was hoped that temporary repairs could keep Fürst Bismarck in service until the new armored cruiser Blücher could be sent to replace her, but Fürst Bismarck continued to suffer from maintenance problems, which were greater than could be remedied in the floating dock in Qingdao (and would have been too expensive to do elsewhere in Asia), This led the naval command to send the armored cruiser Scharnhorst to relieve her earlier than Blücher would be available. It was planned that the ships would meet in Singapore to transfer the admiral and his staff to Scharnhorst in August 1909.

During a pre-voyage inspection in Qingdao in early 1909, Fürst Bismarck was found to have more serious problems than previously known. One of her main drain pumps was inoperable, and significant holing of her inner bottom caused by rust was discovered. Accordingly, the return voyage for the ship was moved forward, and she sailed from Qingdao on 8 April. She rendezvoused with Scharnhorst, the new flagship of the East Asia Squadron, in Colombo on 29 April. Fürst Bismarck arrived in Kiel on 13 June, where she was decommissioned on 26 June.

=== Later career ===
In 1910, Fürst Bismarck was taken into the shipyard at the Kaiserliche Werft in Kiel for an extensive modernization. Part of the work also included converting the ship into a torpedo training ship to replace the old ironclad Württemberg. Her heavy fighting masts were replaced with lighter pole masts and her obsolete 3.7 cm guns were removed. (Note: According to Hildebrand, Röhr, & Steinmetz, the ship had her two aft-most 15 cm turrets removed during this refit, but Dirk Nottelmann states that "an alleged reduction of armament cannot be confirmed." He instead places the removal of all six turret guns during World War I, four in 1916 and the other pair in 1917.) The torpedo tube on the forward port side was removed to provide instructional space. The work proceeded slowly, lasting for four years, and was completed shortly after the outbreak of World War I in July 1914. On 28 November, Fürst Bismarck was recommissioned under the command of KzS Ferdinand Bertram, the former head of the artillery school. She initially completed sea trials while in dockyard hands, but owing to her low combat value was not assigned to a front-line unit. In addition, the severe shortage of trained crewmen precluded an attempt to ready the ship for combat operations. Instead, she was allocated to I Marine Inspectorate based in Kiel for use as a training ship.

Fürst Bismarck began another round of sea trials on 16 January 1915, now under Navy command. During this period, she also fired her guns for the first time since returning to service. She then returned to the shipyard to have sluice valves cut into her longitudinal bulkheads. This was a measure applied to many of the older ships still in service, which was intended to prevent capsizing in the event of underwater damage on one side of the hull. Over the following months, while work on the ship was ongoing, Fürst Bismarck made frequent, short voyages into the Bay of Kiel for training exercises, including gunnery practice. Several of these trips had to be cancelled because of reported enemy submarines in the area. The ship conducted target shooting against the old ironclad Sachsen, then in use as a target ship. Beginning in late February, she was used as a mobile target for German submarine crews. The ship was drydocked from 13 to 24 March for further alterations, including modified screws that had reduced thrust. She was thereafter used as a semi-stationary training ship for engine room crews. The ship was moored fore and aft to buoys, and because the screws generated minimal thrust, they could be run in either direction and not move the ship. One of the benefits of the ship was the fact that she still had both water- and fire-tube boilers, so men could be trained to operate a variety of ships.

The ship was progressively disarmed over the following months, so that the guns could be employed elsewhere. On 17 December 1915, all of her 8.8 cm guns were removed, and between 4 and 15 May 1916, the 24 cm guns and four of the six 15 cm guns were removed. The aft main battery turret was converted into another school room later. From 4 to 6 September, the remaining eight 15 cm guns were removed. On 29 January 1917, the ship was drydocked again to have her screws converted back to allow her to get underway so she could be used for other training tasks. Because the ship was significantly lighter after the removal of her guns, some 200 t (200 long tons; 220 short tons) of scrap iron had to be added, along with 800 t (790 long tons; 880 short tons) of water in some of her internal voids to correct her trim. From 1917 she was also used to train commanders for the Type U-151 cruiser submarines and the navy's zeppelins. Fürst Bismarck was decommissioned on 31 December 1918 after Germany's defeat in the war, though she remained in the fleet's inventory into mid-1919. She served as a floating office until 27 May before being stricken from the naval register on 17 June. She was then transferred to what was now the Reichswerft in Kiel (what had formerly been the Kaiserliche Werft) and then sold initially to the Wirtschaftgemeinschaft company in Schleswig-Holstein later in 1919. The ship was then resold to the ship breaking firm Brandt & Sohn of Audorf, which scrapped the ship over the course of 1919 and 1920 in Rendsburg-Audorf.
