= SMS Prinz Heinrich =

Armored cruiser of the German Imperial Navy

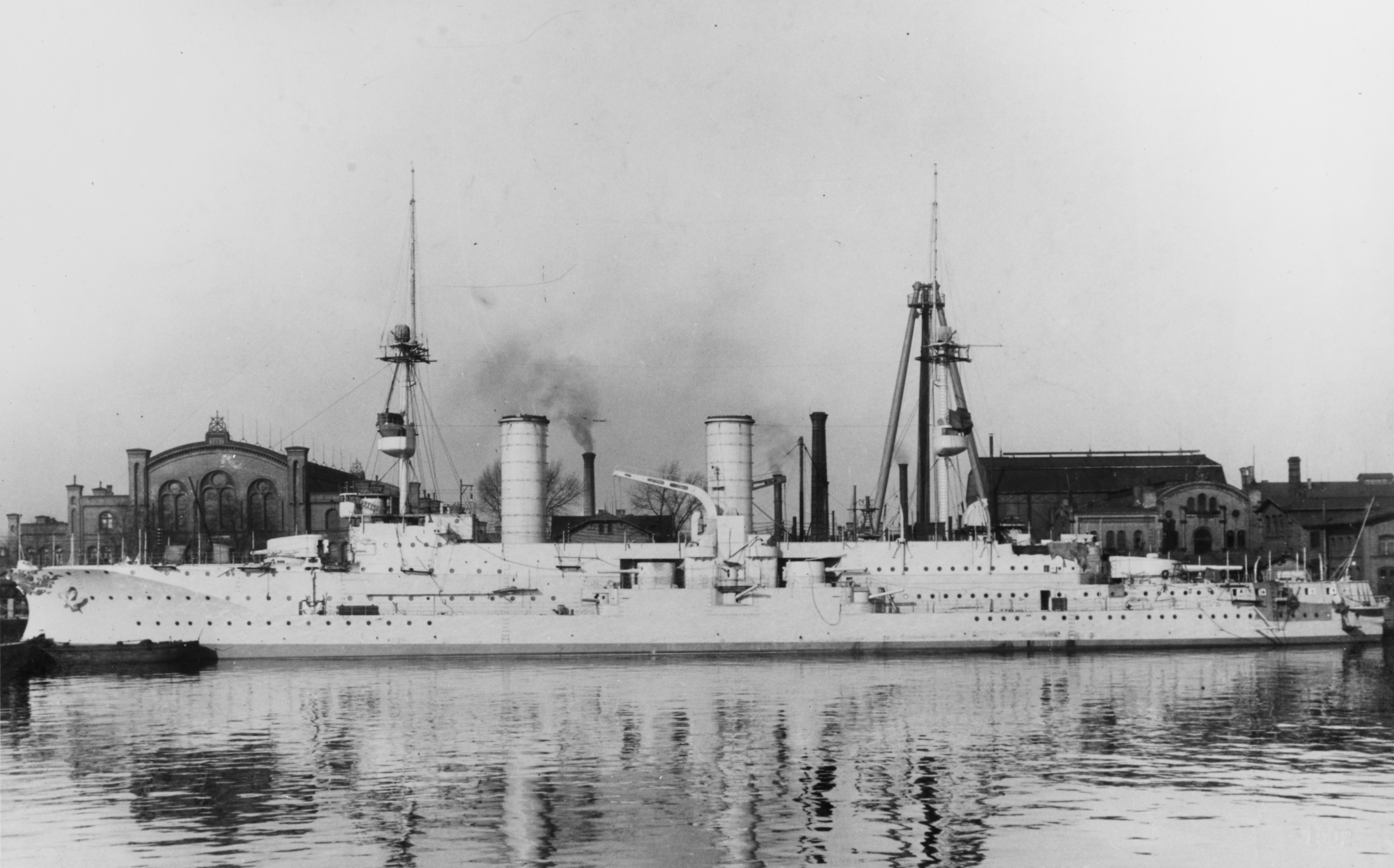
- Prinz Heinrich in port in 1902, probably while fitting-out

Class overview
- Preceded by: Fürst Bismarck
- Succeeded by: Prinz Adalbert class

History

German Empire
- Name: Prinz Heinrich
- Namesake: Prince Heinrich of Prussia
- Builder: Kaiserliche Werft, Kiel
- Laid down: 1 December 1898
- Launched: 22 March 1900
- Commissioned: 11 March 1902
- Decommissioned: 27 March 1916
- Stricken: 25 January 1920
- Fate: Broken up, 1920

General characteristics
- Type: Armored cruiser
- Displacement: Normal: 8,887 metric tons (8,747 long tons); Full load: 9,806 t (9,651 long tons)
- Length: 126.5 m (415 ft) o/a
- Beam: 19.6 m (64 ft 4 in)
- Draft: 8.07 m (26 ft 6 in)
- Installed power: 15,000 PS (15,000 ihp); 14 Dürr water-tube boilers
- Propulsion: 3 × triple-expansion steam engines; 3 × screw propellers
- Speed: 20 knots (37 km/h; 23 mph)
- Range: 4,580 nmi (8,480 km; 5,270 mi) at 10 kn (19 km/h; 12 mph)
- Complement: 35 officers; 532 enlisted men
- Armament: 2 × 24 cm (9.4 in) SK L/40 guns; 10 × 15 cm (5.9 in) SK L/40 guns; 10 × 8.8 cm (3.5 in) SK L/30 guns; 4 × 45 cm (17.7 in) torpedo tubes
- Armor: Belt: 10 cm (3.9 in); Turrets: 15 cm (5.9 in); Deck: 3.5–4 cm (1.4–1.6 in)

SMS Prinz Heinrich was a unique German armored cruiser built at the turn of the 20th century for the German Kaiserliche Marine (Imperial Navy), and was named after Prince Heinrich. The second vessel of that type built in Germany, Prinz Heinrich was constructed at the Kaiserliche Werft (Imperial Shipyard) in Kiel, being laid down in December 1898, launched in March 1900, and commissioned in March 1902. Prinz Heinrich's design was a modification of the previous armored cruiser, Fürst Bismarck, and traded a smaller main battery and thinner (but more effective) armor for higher speed. All subsequent German armored cruisers were incremental developments of Prinz Heinrich.

Prinz Heinrich served with the German fleet in home waters for just four years, from 1902 to 1906, when she was withdrawn from front-line service. During this period, she served as the flagship of the fleet's Scouting Forces, and she was primarily occupied with fleet training. The ship was out of service from early 1906 to mid-1908, when she was reactivated for use as a gunnery training ship, a role she filled until late 1912. Prinz Heinrich underwent modernization and conversion into a dedicated training ship in 1914, and the work was completed just before the outbreak of World War I in July that year.

After the start of war, the ship was reactivated for active service, initially with III Scouting Group with the High Seas Fleet. Prinz Heinrich was used for coastal defense in the North Sea and she participated in the fleet sortie that supported the raid on Scarborough, Hartlepool and Whitby in December 1914. After the naval command determined Prinz Heinrich was too old to serve in the North Sea against the powerful British Royal Navy, she was transferred to the Baltic Sea in early 1915. She supported offensive minelaying operations and patrolled the central Baltic for Russian forces, but never encountered any. She provided gunfire support during the attack on Libau in May 1915 and again shelled Russian positions during the Battle of the Gulf of Riga in August. In the face of severe crew shortages in late 1915, Prinz Heinrich had her crew reduced and was ultimately decommissioned and disarmed in March 1916. She thereafter served in a variety of secondary roles for the rest of the war, before being sold to be broken up in 1920.

== Background ==
In December 1895, Kaiser Wilhelm II, the German emperor, issued a directive to Admiral Friedrich von Hollmann to prepare a proposal for future naval construction through fiscal year 1907/1908. Hollmann was the state secretary of the Reichsmarineamt (RMA—Imperial Naval Office). Wilhelm had already laid out the number of ships he decided would be necessary, in light of Russian naval construction. His projections included a total of nine armored cruisers, (Note: Armored cruisers were vessels that generally possessed side armor intended to serve on foreign stations, as a fast wing of a fleet of battleships, or to attack or protect merchant shipping. Side armor differentiated them from large protected cruisers that only incorporated an armor deck for defense against enemy fire.) counting Fürst Bismarck, which had not yet begun construction. At least one of the vessels was to have been a sister ship, with subsequent vessels expected to be developments thereof. It was estimated that each unit was to cost 19,300,000 marks, a significant amount. The plan soon came to nothing, however, as the Kaiser's request was unrealistically expensive and the Reichstag (Imperial Diet) would not have funded it.

Clearly, any future large cruisers would have to be smaller and cheaper than Fürst Bismarck. In a subsequent memorandum to Wilhelm, Hollmann noted that the cruisers he had requested were only 720,00 marks less than contemporary battleships, while the somewhat smaller and more lightly armed Victoria Louise class of protected cruisers cost roughly half as much, at 9,650,000 marks per ship. He argued that the cheaper ships were preferable, since they could be built in larger numbers and faster than the larger cruisers. Hollmann also noted that if the fleet was able to secure the necessary funding to build such a large cruiser, it would be preferable to build battleships instead, since they were more useful from a strategic perspective; this reflected the thinking of the Military Department of the RMA. Wilhelm approved the memorandum, but nevertheless continued to pursue larger ships.

Accordingly, Hollmann requested funds for two new protected cruisers of the Victoria Louise class for the 1897/1898 fiscal year, but the Reichstag refused to grant funds for them. Hollmann had already been in a weak position politically, and the failure to secure funding led to his removal from office. He was soon replaced by Admiral Alfred von Tirpitz. Work on the new armored cruiser was deferred for a year, and it was decided that when funding for more cruisers could be obtained, the next vessels would be the two Victoria Louise-class ships that Hollmann had attempted to order.

== Design ==
=== Initial studies ===
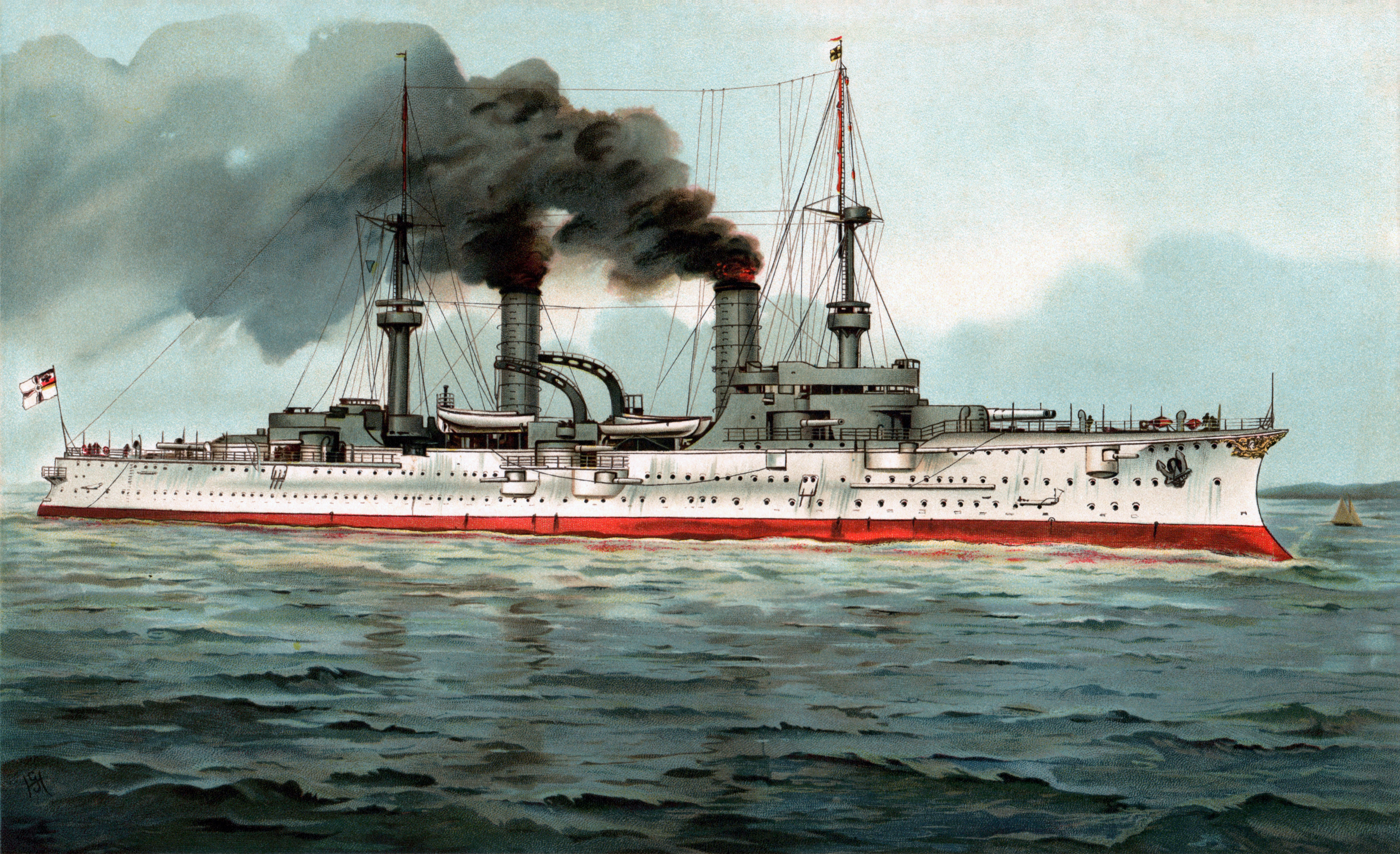
Fürst Bismarck, Germany's first armored cruiser; note the heavy military masts and dispersed secondary battery guns, both not repeated for Prinz Heinrich

Aware that a repeat of Fürst Bismarck was impossible due to its cost, the Construction Department of the RMA, led by Alfred Dietrich, began tentative work on what was then referred to as "cruiser A" on 12 June 1897. Work began at the request of Konteradmiral (KAdm—Rear Admiral) Wilhelm Büchsel, who was then serving as the acting state secretary of the RMA, as Tirpitz had not yet arrived to take his new post. Büchsel set the basic criteria as: armament identical to the Victoria Louise class, but substituting a pair of 24 cm (9.4 in) guns in place of the 21 cm (8.3 in) guns in practicable; sufficient draft to clear the Suez Canal; a hull sheathed with Muntz metal; and a complete armor belt at the waterline that was to be 150 mm (5.9 in). Dietrich responded to Büchsel's request already on 13 June with a proposal that retained the 21 cm guns, which was estimated to cost 13,720,000 marks. The design staff soon followed with a number of variations for 21 cm and 24 cm armed ships, but a major problem that confronted them was the constraints on the proposed ship's size imposed by existing port facilities. This directly related to the beam and draft that was necessary to fit the required weapons, which had knock-on effects for the ship's speed and stability.

By August, the RMA began holding internal discussions to evaluate what characteristics should be prioritized. Compared to Fürst Bismarck, the new ship's displacement had to be reduced by about 1,500 metric tons (1,500 long tons) to keep costs at an acceptable level. The General Department stated that the cruiser should be viewed as an improvement on the Victoria Louise class, not a retrograde step from Fürst Bismarck, the primary objective being to increase the former's ability to fight in the line of battle by adding belt armor and the larger 24 cm guns. As such, they argued that the number of 24 cm guns should be increased to four at the expense of the secondary armament of 15 cm (5.9 in) guns, which they pointed out were increasingly unable to penetrate medium armor at projected battle ranges. By that time, Tirpitz had arrived, and he asked Dietrich to provide estimated costs for three variants: A, armed with two 24 cm guns and eight 15 cm guns, B, which increased the number of 15 cm guns to ten, and C, which carried four 24 cm guns and eight 15 cm weapons.

In the meantime, Dietrich had prepared a memorandum, which he submitted to Tirpitz on 1 September, which presented his thoughts on the process thus far. His primary concern at that point was the layout of the armor scheme, since the Victoria Louise class had no armor belt. He put forth five proposals, including a partial belt scheme similar to the British Orlando-class cruisers; a complete belt with a thin armor deck connected to the top of the belt; and a thinner belt that had a thicker armor deck lowered to connect to the bottom edge via downward-sloping sides. The last option was a recent development in foreign navies, and Dietrich assumed that they had conducted firing tests that demonstrated its superior resistance to shellfire. He therefore recommended it for the new cruiser, despite not having any practical experience with it. The RMA approved Dietrich's memorandum in mid-September, and agreed to move forward with his suggested armor layout. Compared to Fürst Bismarck, the new ship's armor layout would be thinner but more comprehensive. This was accomplished in part through advances in steel technology, which meant that her armor layout was in fact significantly more effective than Fürst Bismarck's. Krupp had recently developed cemented armor plate, which was considerably stronger than earlier Harvey armor, so less could be used to achieve the same level of protection. In addition, the belt could be made taller, extending up to the main deck level, which protected more of the ship's interior. The sloped deck armor considerably strengthened the protection system by providing another layer of armor that would need to be penetrated before the ship's vitals could be damaged.

Victoria Louise, which provided the starting point for the design of Prinz Heinrich

Tirpitz convened a meeting on 8 October to evaluate several pressing issues, including the plans to build "cruiser A", though his first concern was not to jeopardize the prospects of the naval law he sought to pass through the Reichstag. Accordingly, he informed the department chiefs that costs were strictly limited so as not to run afoul of the parliament. He decided that the two 24 cm, ten 15 cm armament should be adopted, though the specific arrangement remained undefined. He asked Dietrich to evaluate different positioning, including gun turrets, casemates, and a central battery. As work on the design continued, by January 1898 it had become apparent that the ship would not be able to meet the speed requirements, and indeed would be slower than Victoria Louise, which was unacceptable. Two options became apparent: either reduce the armament or armor, or remove the sheathing from the hull; the latter was chosen. Work on the cruiser slowed for a time, however, potentially due to the RMA's focus on passing the naval law, which it succeeded in doing in April.

=== Refining the design ===
Now that the cruiser was formally authorized by the naval law, work on "A" resumed in earnest with another of Dietrich's memorandums on 3 June 1898. In the document, he included a central longitudinal watertight bulkhead that divided the engine and boiler rooms, which was believed to improve resistance to flooding. (Note: It would, in fact, have the opposite effect, since asymmetrical flooding could cause very dangerous instability and lead to capsizing. Such bulkheads came to be known as "ship killers.") Because Dietrich's proposal for the armor layout had been adopted, the belt armor was reduced in thickness from 150 to 100 mm (5.9 to 3.9 in), though the main battery turrets and their barbettes retained the 150 mm armor plate. An armored fire-control station with coincidence rangefinders was added to the top of the conning tower, which had not previously been used in German warships. Despite arguments to increase the caliber of the secondary guns, the need to meet strict cost limits meant that any such change was out of the question. The torpedo armament was set at three torpedo tubes, one in the bow and one on each side.

On 6 September 1898, Dietrich died and not long after, the Construction Department was reorganized, now with Büchsel as its head. A series of changes were then made to the design, owing in large part to the death of Dietrich. He had preferred the use of Belleville boilers for the ship over the new Dürr boiler; Dietrich's proposed propulsion system was to have provided 12,000 metric horsepower (12,000 ihp) and a top speed of 19.25 knots (35.65 km/h; 22.15 mph). Büchsel suggested adopting the Dürr boilers in February 1899, along with several other changes, including a fourth torpedo tube in the stern and slight reductions in some of the less important armor plate to save weight. Provisions were adopted to allow the use of supplemental tar oil firing for the boilers. Wilhelm II approved the changes on 6 February, though work on the new cruiser had already begun on 1 December 1898.

== Characteristics ==
=== Dimensions and machinery ===
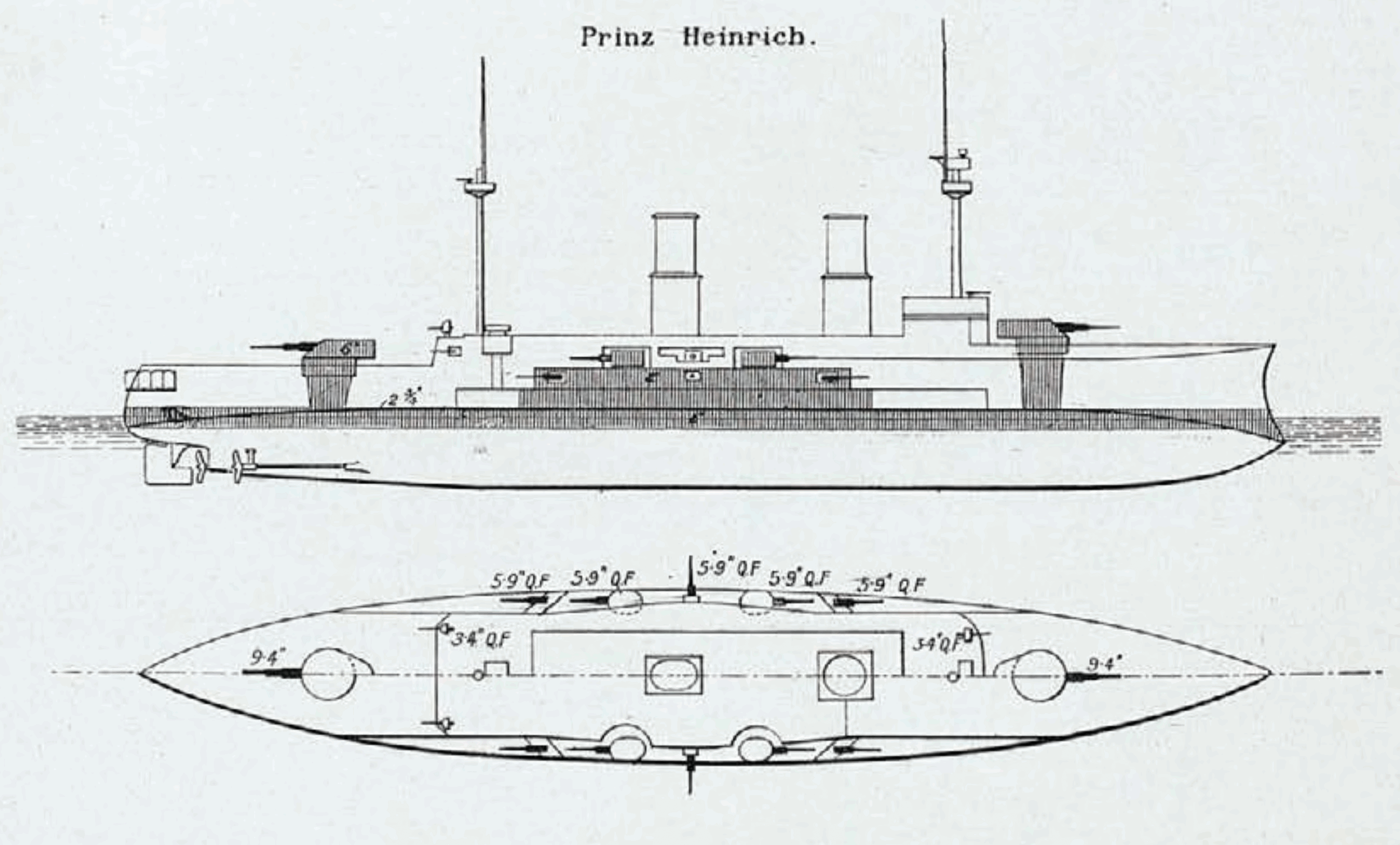
Plan and profile drawing of Prinz Heinrich

Prinz Heinrich was 124.9 meters (409 ft 9 in) long at the waterline and 126.5 m (415 ft) overall. She had a beam of 19.6 m (64 ft 4 in) and a draft of 7.65 m (25 ft 1 in) forward and 8.07 m (26 ft 6 in) aft. The ship displaced 8,887 metric tons (8,747 long tons; 9,796 short tons) as built, and 9,806 t (9,651 long tons; 10,809 short tons) at full load. The hull was constructed with transverse and longitudinal steel frames, and incorporated thirteen watertight compartments and a double bottom that extended for 57 percent of the length of the ship. The German navy considered the ship to be a good sea boat with gentle motion in most respects, though she suffered from severe roll. Prinz Heinrich was crewed by 35 officers and 532 enlisted men. For the duration of her career as the second command flagship of the Cruiser Division, the standard crew was augmented by an additional nine officers and 44 enlisted men. She carried a number of smaller vessels, including two picket boats, a launch, a pinnace, two cutters, two yawls, and two dinghies.

The ship was propelled by three vertical 4-cylinder triple expansion engines; the center shaft drove a four-bladed screw propeller 4.28 m (14 ft) in diameter while the two outer shafts drove 4.65-meter (15.3 ft) wide four-bladed screws. Fourteen Dürr-type water-tube boilers, produced by Düsseldorf-Ratinger Röhrenkesselfabrik, supplied steam to the engines at pressures up to 15 standard atmospheres (1,500 kPa). The boilers were ducted into two funnels amidships. The propulsion system was rated at 15,000 metric horsepower (15,000 ihp) and gave the ship a top speed of 20 knots (37 km/h; 23 mph), though on sea trials, Prinz Heinrich's engines reached 15,694 PS (15,479 ihp) but a top speed of only 19.9 kn (36.9 km/h; 22.9 mph) during a six-hour test. During a 24-hour continuous steaming test, while operating at about two-thirds power, she averaged 18.2 knots (33.7 km/h; 20.9 mph). She was designed to carry 900 t (890 long tons; 990 short tons) of coal, though additional storage allowed up to 1,590 t (1,560 long tons; 1,750 short tons). This enabled a maximum range of 2,290 nautical miles (4,240 km; 2,640 mi) at a speed of 18 kn (33 km/h; 21 mph) and 4,580 nmi (8,480 km; 5,270 mi) at a cruising speed of 10 kn (19 km/h; 12 mph). The cruising range was not particularly long, but it was acceptable for operations in the North Sea with the main fleet.

=== Armament ===
Prinz Heinrich in the Kaiser Wilhelm Canal, passing the Levensau High Bridge

Prinz Heinrich's primary armament consisted of two 24 cm (9.4 in) SK L/40 quick-firing guns mounted in single turrets, (Note: In Imperial German Navy gun nomenclature, "SK" (Schnelladekanone) denotes the gun is quick loading, while the L/40 denotes the length of the gun. In this case, the L/40 gun is 40 calibers, meaning the gun is 40 times as long as it is in bore diameter.) one at either end of the superstructure. These guns were supplied with 75 rounds each; they could depress to −4° and elevate to 30°, which enabled a maximum range of 16,900 m (18,500 yd). The guns fired a 140 kg (310 lb) round at a muzzle velocity of 835 m (2,740 ft) per second. The guns were directed from a central fire-control station that was equipped with an early model of the Standgerät (baseline device) stereoscopic rangefinder. The fire-control team could communicate directly with the gun crews for the primary and secondary batteries, as well as the command staff via voice tubes down to the conning tower and the lower, emergency command position deep in the ship.

A secondary battery of ten 15 cm (5.9 in) SK L/40 quick-firing guns rounded out her offensive armament. Six of these guns were mounted in amidships casemates on either side of the vessel, and the remaining four were mounted in turrets in the ship's superstructure above the casemates. These guns were supplied with 120 rounds each. The shells weighed 40 kg (88 lb) and were fired at a muzzle velocity of 800 m (2,600 ft) per second. The guns could elevate to 25° for a maximum range of 13,700 m (15,000 yd).

The cruiser carried ten 8.8 cm (3.5 in) SK L/30 quick-firing guns for defense against torpedo boats. Each of these guns was supplied with 250 shells. The shells weighed 7 kg (15 lb) and were fired at a muzzle velocity of 670 m (2,200 ft) per second. This enabled a maximum range of 7,300 m (8,000 yd) at an elevation of 20°. The ship's gun armament was rounded out by four autocannons, though these were subsequently removed. The ship was also fitted with four 45 cm (17.7 in) torpedo tubes. One was mounted on the stern in a swivel mount, one was mounted submerged in the bow, and one was submerged in the hull on either side abreast of the forward gun turret.

=== Armor ===
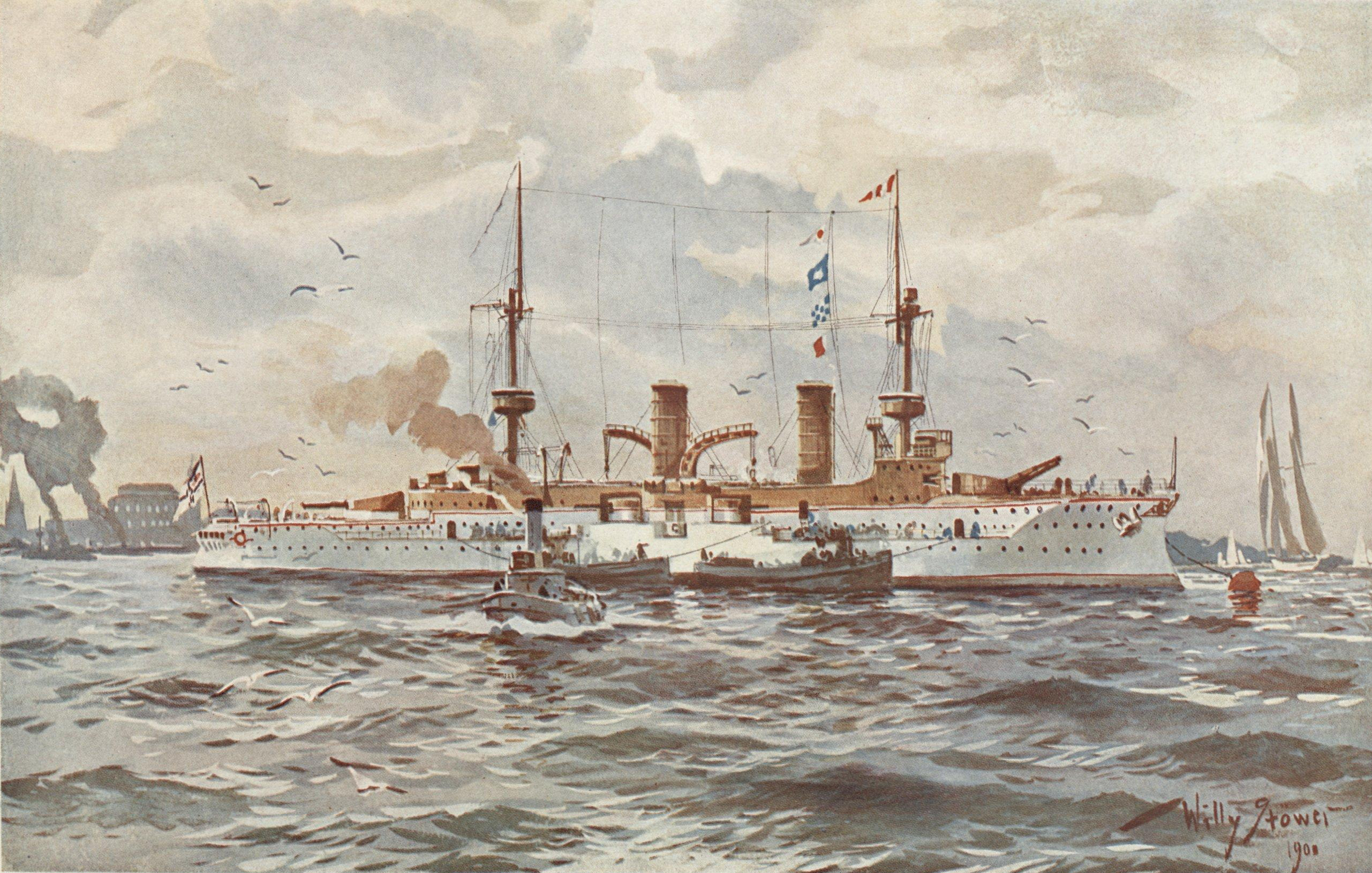
Painting of Prinz Heinrich by Willy Stöwer

Prinz Heinrich's armor consisted of Krupp steel. Her armor belt was 100 millimeters (3.9 in) thick in the central citadel of the ship, which protected the ammunition magazines, machinery spaces, and other vital areas of the cruiser. It was reduced to 80 mm (3.1 in) on either end of the main belt, and the bow and stern were unarmored. The entire length of the belt was backed by teak planks of equal thickness. The armored deck was 35 to 40 mm (1.4 to 1.6 in) thick and was connected to the belt by 50 mm (2 in) thick sloped armor on the broadside.

The forward conning tower had 150 mm (5.9 in) thick sides and a 30 mm (1.2 in) thick roof. Atop the conning tower, the main fire control station received 100 mm of Krupp plate on the 1.4 m (4 ft 7 in) tall sides, though it did not have a roof, which was omitted to reduce weight high in the ship. The aft conning tower was much less thoroughly protected; it was covered by only 12 mm (0.47 in) of steel plating. The main battery gun turrets had 150 mm thick sides and 30 mm thick roofs. The 15 cm gun turrets had 100 mm thick armor, while the casemated weapons were protected by 70 mm (2.8 in) gun shields. The casemates themselves were armored with 100 mm steel plating on the faces; the upper casemates' roofs were 35 mm thick, while the lower positions had 30 mm thick roofs.

=== Evaluation ===
Some older sources, such as Hugh Lyon and John Taylor, writing in 1979 and 1969 respectively, state that Prinz Heinrich was intended for overseas service, but in 2016 Aidan Dodson pointed out the ship's hull was not sheathed with wood and copper or zinc layers, which would have been necessary for any ship deployed overseas where shipyard facilities would not be readily available for the necessary cleaning of marine biofouling. Dodson also noted the ship never actually went abroad on an extended deployment. Dirk Nottelmann concurs, noting that the lack of sheathing precluded it from operating abroad, and that Prinz Heinrich was to serve as the leader of the fleet's reconnaissance ships in home waters.

The ship proved to be an influential design, and all subsequent German armored cruisers were developments of Prinz Heinrich. In fact, the armor layout pioneered in Prinz Heinrich provided the basis of all German capital ships designed over the next forty years, including the final battleships of the Bismarck and H-classes. The design suffered from a number of defects, some of which were common to German armored cruiser designs, but others were repeated in other countries' navies across different ship types. As with the follow-on Prinz Adalbert and Roon classes, Prinz Heinrich was inadequately protected. Her secondary battery guns mounted in casemates were situated too low in the hull, and as a result they were frequently washed out in heavy seas (and therefore unusable). This was a common problem in many navies of the time, and not unique to armored cruisers. In addition, the Prinz Heinrich, Prinz Adalbert, and Roon classes failed to reach their intended speeds. These failures were primarily the result of their length-to-breadth ratio, which was imposed by the limitations of existing dock facilities in Wilhelmshaven.

According to the naval historian Hugh Lyon, speaking of the armored cruisers built by Germany, "when compared to their British contemporaries they do not show up particularly well, in fact, with the possible exception of the last pair, Scharnhorst and Gneisenau, it is probably true to say that the armored cruisers were Germany's worst designed and least battleworthy ships in service in 1905." Contemporary German naval officer Vizeadmiral (Vice Admiral) Albert Hopman referred to Prinz Heinrich as "cheap, but bad" in his memoirs Logbuch eines Seeoffiziers (Log of a Sea Officer). The naval historians Hans Hildebrand, Albert Röhr, and Hans-Otto Steinmetz regard Hopman's criticism as an exaggeration, pointing out Prinz Heinrich compared well to foreign contemporaries like the French Desaix, the Russian Bayan, and the Italian Giuseppe Garibaldi, though she was inferior to British designs. She nevertheless spent only four years in active service in peacetime before being replaced by newer, more powerful cruisers. (Note: Just four years after Prinz Heinrich entered service, the revolutionary all-big-gun battleship HMS Dreadnought was completed, followed soon-after by the similarly armed battlecruiser HMS Invincible.)

== Service history ==
=== Peacetime career ===
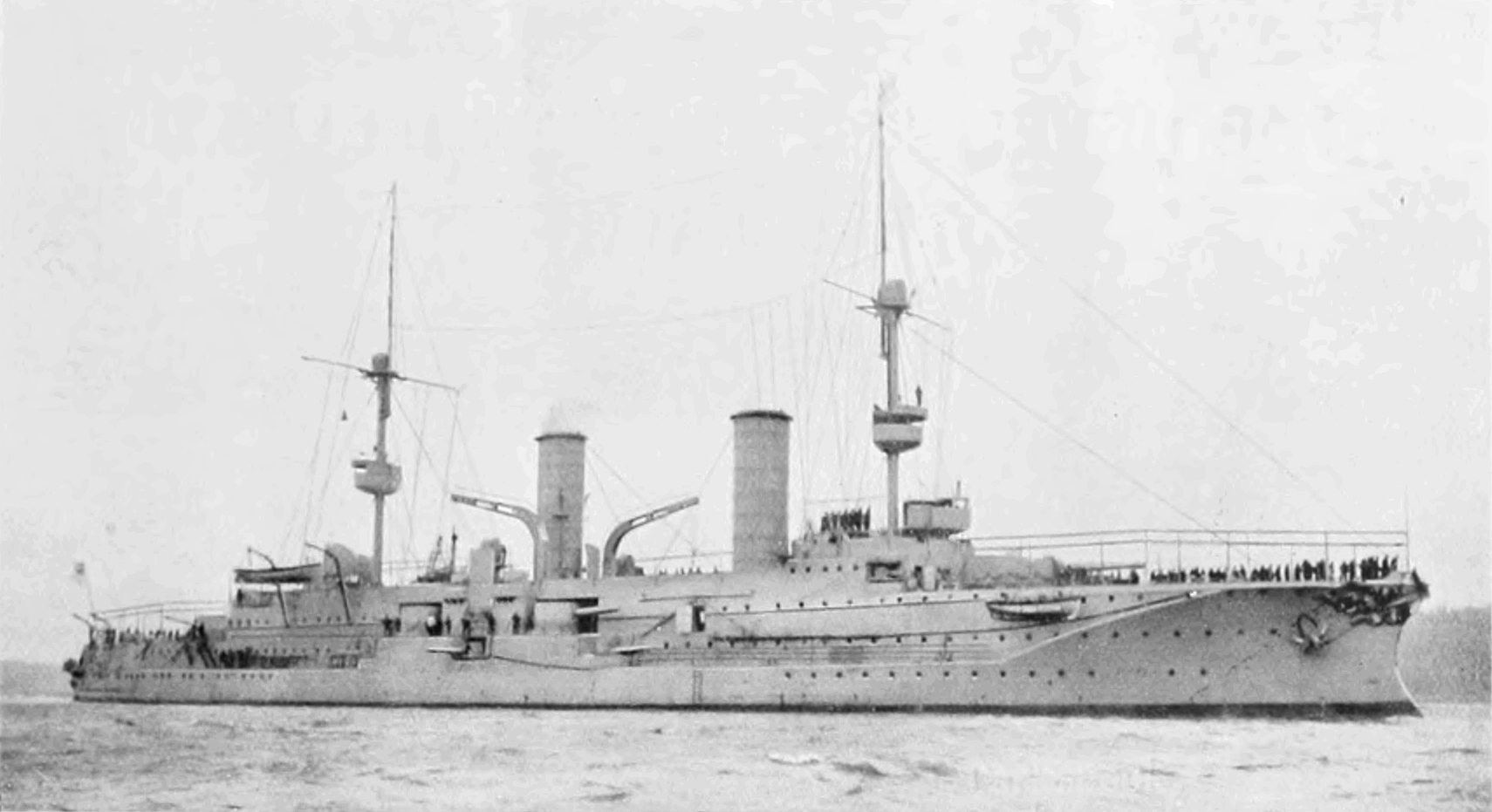
Prinz Heinrich in 1902

Prinz Heinrich was laid down on 1 December 1898 at the Kaiserliche Werft (Imperial Shipyard) in Kiel under the provisional designation "A". (Note: German warships were ordered under provisional names. Additions to the fleet were given a single letter; ships intended to replace older or lost vessels were ordered as "Ersatz (name of the ship to be replaced)".) She was launched on 22 March 1900, when she was christened by Princess Irene; the ship's namesake, her husband Prince Heinrich of Prussia, was present at the ceremony, and the Generalinspekteur der Marine (General Inspector of the Navy), Admiral Hans von Koester, gave a speech. The ship was completed just under two years later, on 11 March 1902. She then began sea trials that lasted until June, at which point she joined the reconnaissance forces attached to I Squadron. She took part in training activities with the squadron, including a training cruise in Norwegian waters from 8 to 20 July. In August, she escorted Wilhelm II aboard his yacht Hohenzollern during a trip to meet Czar Nicholas II of Russia in Reval. Prinz Heinrich next took part in fleet training in August and September, where she served as the flagship of II Scouting Group, which included the light cruisers Niobe and Nymphe. After the conclusion of the maneuvers on 18 September, the pre-dreadnought battleship Kurfürst Friedrich Wilhelm was decommissioned for maintenance; the ship was serving as the flagship of Konteradmiral (KAdm—Rear Admiral) Curt von Prittwitz und Gaffron, the deputy commander of the squadron. While the ship was out of service, Prittwitz und Gaffron transferred to Prinz Heinrich, though he remained there only briefly, before he was replaced by KAdm Ludwig Borckenhagen on 1 October. Prinz Heinrich and the rest of the squadron ended the year with a winter training cruise, during which she tried to pull the new battleship Wittelsbach free on 17 December after she ran aground in the Great Belt.

The 1900 Naval Law created the position of Commander of Scouting Forces to oversee all of the scouting groups, but it was not filled until 30 December 1902, when Wilhelm II issued a decree naming Borckenhagen to the position, with Prinz Heinrich as his flagship. Borckenhagen therefore remained aboard Prinz Heinrich, which formally became the flagship of the Scouting Forces on 1 March 1903. Prinz Heinrich, the protected cruiser Victoria Louise, and light cruisers Amazone and Ariadne conducted training maneuvers beginning in April. On 12 April, they were joined by the light cruiser Medusa; by 2 May they were joined by the light cruisers Frauenlob and Niobe. The ships took part in the autumn fleet maneuvers in August and September, after which Borckenhagen was replaced by KAdm Gustav Schmidt. Prinz Heinrich participated in the fleet training activities of 1903, which included a visit to Spain from 7 May to 10 August. During the cruise, she stayed in Vigo, Spain, from 20 to 30 May. After returning to Germany, the fleet then conducted its annual training exercises, which concluded on 22 September. On 25 January 1904, Prinz Heinrich went to help the Norwegian town of Ålesund in the aftermath of a fire that had caused extensive destruction. She stayed there, rendering assistance, until 1 February. In mid-1904, the new armored cruiser Friedrich Carl joined the Scouting Forces. The typical autumn maneuvers took place in August and September, during which Prinz Heinrich won the Kaiser's Schiesspreis (Shooting Prize) for excellent accuracy by large cruisers. On 3 December, Schmidt transferred his flag to Friedrich Carl.

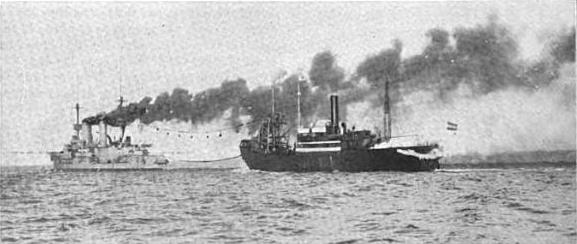
Prinz Heinrich coaling from the collier Hermann Sauber during experiments in February 1907

The year 1905 passed without incident, following the same routine as previous years. From 11 March to 20 June, Prinz Heinrich again served as Schmidt's flagship, as Friedrich Carl was occupied with escorting Hohenzollern on a trip abroad. In early July, Prinz Heinrich experimented with a new coaling apparatus developed by Georg Leue, an engineer from Berlin, at the request of Wilhelm II; further tests were made with it in November and February 1906. The apparatus involved a system of ropes and pulleys attached to both ships' masts that could be used to transfer bags of coal from the collier Hermann Sauber to Prinz Heinrich. The device did not perform as expected, and further testing was discontinued. She visited Uddevalla and Södertälje in Sweden in mid-1905. She had another stint as flagship from 10 to 26 August while Friedrich Carl was in dry dock for maintenance. On 1 October, the position of Deputy Commander of Scouting Forces was created, and Prinz Heinrich's commander, Kapitän zur See (KzS—Captain at Sea) Raimund Winkler became the first to fill the role. In March 1906, the ship was removed from the reconnaissance forces, her place having been taken by Friedrich Carl, which had in turn been replaced by the new armored cruiser Yorck. By this time, Prinz Heinrich had spent just four years on active service with the fleet. She was decommissioned on 4 April.

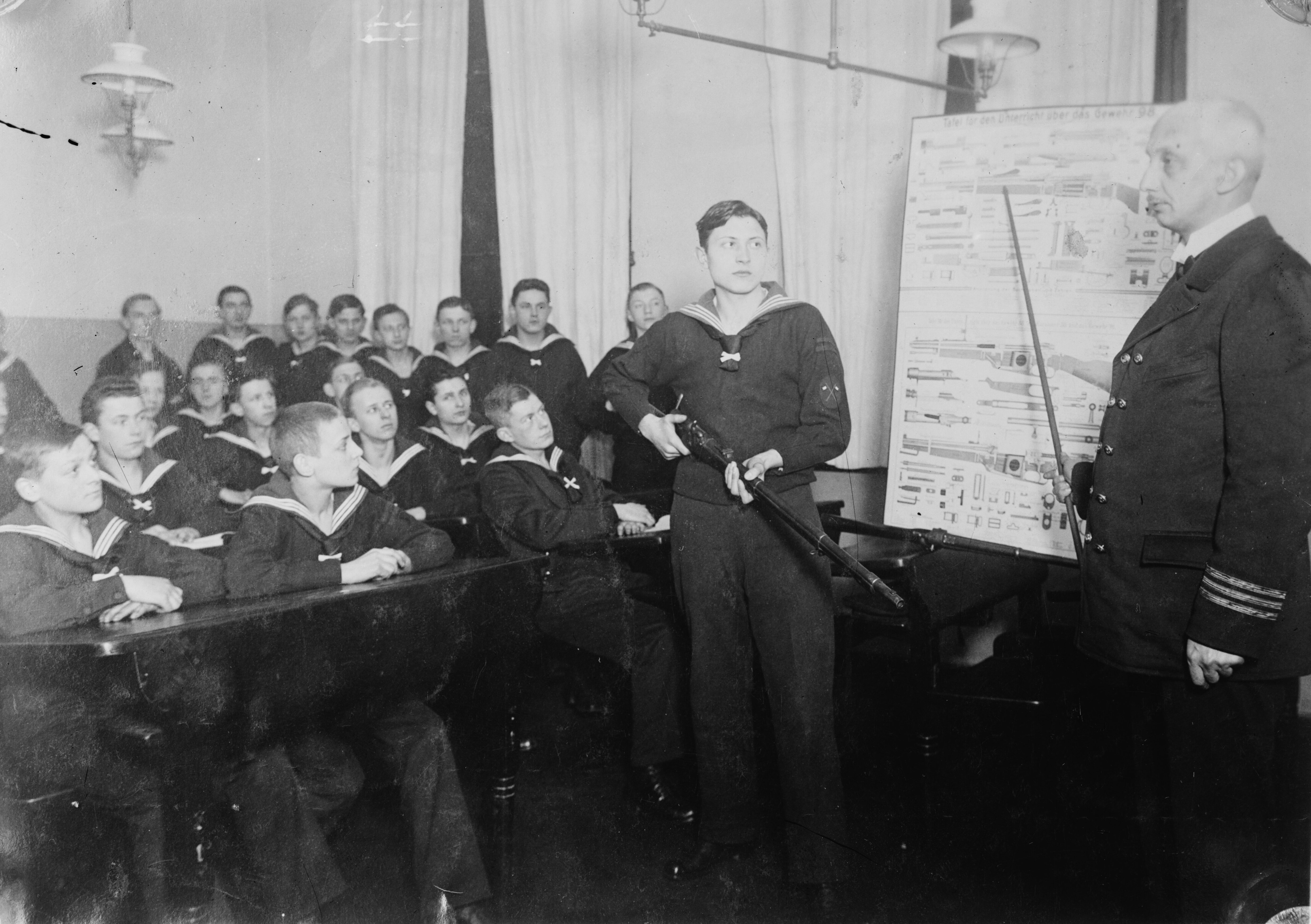
Training cadets on small arms aboard Prinz Heinrich

Prinz Heinrich had spent two years in reserve when she was reactivated on 15 May 1908 to replace the old gunnery training ship Mars. She went to Sonderburg on 22 June, where the Naval Artillery Inspectorate was located. Over the next four years, Prinz Heinrich largely remained in port where she trained gunners for the fleet until she was replaced by the armored cruiser Prinz Adalbert in October 1912. Prinz Heinrich was decommissioned again on 31 October; a year later, in November 1913, the Reichsmarineamt began exploring the possibility of converting the ship into a dedicated training vessel, and the naval command decided it should still be possible to use the vessel as a warship in the event of an emergency. In early 1914, Prinz Heinrich went into dry dock at the Kaiserliche Werft in Kiel for the conversion. The arrangement of the searchlights was modified, the superstructure deck bulwark was removed, and the masts were modernized. Conversion work was completed just before the outbreak of World War I in July 1914.

=== World War I ===
==== Operations in the North Sea ====
Following the wave of declarations of war between the major European powers at the end of July and early August 1914, Britain declared war on Germany on 5 August. Prinz Heinrich was reactivated for wartime service the same day, and she then went into the shipyard in Kiel for preparation work. Work on the ship continued for some time, as her propulsion system was not in good condition, and her first trials were not carried out until 27 August. Tests were carried out into early September, by which time it was found that all of her boiler condensers were leaking and the feed pumps needed to be rebuilt. The ship could not make more than 16.5 knots (30.6 km/h; 19.0 mph) at that point. She was then assigned to the defenses of the port in advance of an expected British attack on Kiel on 25–26 September. Prinz Heinrich and Prinz Adalbert were sent into the Danish straits, anchoring off Langeland to ambush any British forces that passed through the straits. When that failed to materialize, Prinz Heinrich was ordered back to Kiel to complete the reconstruction of her feed pumps. While this work was still ongoing, Prinz Heinrich was assigned to III Scouting Group, part of the High Seas Fleet, though she did not join the unit at its base at Wilhelmshaven until 8 November.

From 8 November to 14 April 1915, Prinz Heinrich was primarily occupied with guard duty in the Jade Bay and the river Ems. During this period, she went to the Baltic for more sea trials in early December 1914. She then participated in the second major German offensive in the North Sea, the operation to bombard Hartlepool on 15–16 December. Prinz Heinrich, along with Roon, the light cruiser Hamburg, and a flotilla of torpedo boats, was assigned to the van of the High Seas Fleet, commanded by Admiral Friedrich von Ingenohl. The main fleet was providing distant cover to KAdm Franz von Hipper's battlecruisers conducting the bombardment. During the night of the 15th, the German battle fleet of some twelve dreadnoughts and eight pre-dreadnoughts came within 10 nmi (19 km; 12 mi) of an isolated squadron of six British battleships. However, skirmishes between the rival destroyer screens in the darkness convinced Ingenohl he was faced with the entire Grand Fleet. Under orders from Kaiser Wilhelm II to avoid risking the fleet unnecessarily, Ingenohl broke off the engagement and turned the battle fleet back toward Germany. Prinz Heinrich did not engage any British vessels during the skirmishes, her crew seeing only distant gun flashes from other vessels.

Prinz Heinrich was stationed in the Schillig roadstead on guard duty over the next several days, alternating with periods in the inner Wilhelmshaven roadstead to rest the crew. III Scouting Group was then transferred to the mouth of the Ems to reinforce the local defense forces. A British attack on shipping in the area was anticipated, though nothing took place. The Germans then returned to Wilhelmshaven. On the morning of 24 January 1915, the battlecruisers of I Scouting Group were attacked by superior British forces in the Battle of Dogger Bank. Prinz Heinrich and the rest of III Scouting Group sortied at around 12:00 to come to the battlecruisers' aid, but they arrived far too late to take part in the action. Prinz Heinrich was drydocked for most of February to have a sluice cut into the longitudinal bulkhead; the danger having been amply demonstrated by the loss of Yorck in November 1914.

==== Transfer to the Baltic ====
In early 1915, it was determined the twelve-year-old Prinz Heinrich had no place in operations against the powerful British Grand Fleet. Accordingly, on 12 April 1915, III Scouting Group was detached from the High Seas Fleet and the ships were transferred to the Baltic Sea to operate against the Russian Baltic Fleet. On 15 April, the ships arrived in Kiel, where they came under command of then-KAdm Hopman, the commander of reconnaissance forces in the Baltic. The ships were initially based at Swinemünde, but a base further east was desired, so they were transferred to Weichselmünde at the mouth of the Oder river. This was found to be an unsuitable anchorage, as the entrance was very shallow and Prinz Heinrich ran aground several times at low tide. Hopman was then in the process of planning a major attack on Libau in conjunction with an attempt by the German Army to seize the city. The attack took place on 7 May, and consisted of Prinz Heinrich, Roon, and Prinz Adalbert, the elderly coast defense ship Beowulf, and the light cruisers Augsburg, Thetis, and Lübeck. They were escorted by a number of destroyers, torpedo boats, and minesweepers. The IV Scouting Group of the High Seas Fleet was detached from the North Sea to provide cover for the operation. The bombardment went as planned, though the destroyer V107 struck a mine in Libau's harbor, which blew off her bow and destroyed the ship. German ground forces were successful in their assault however, and took the city. The Germans then began work on the harbor there for use as the primary base for III Scouting Group, but it would be some time before the facilities were ready to support the ships, and so they returned to Weichselmünde for the time being.

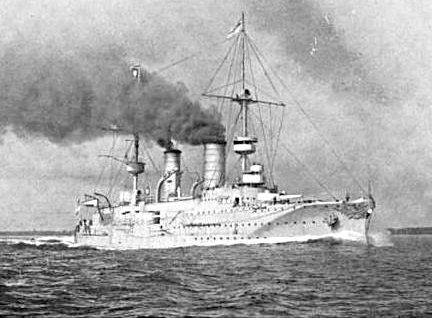
Prinz Heinrich steaming at high speed

Prinz Heinrich supported a minelaying operation off the coast of Finland over the course of 23–26 May. From 3 to 5 June, Prinz Heinrich participated in a sortie into the Gulf of Finland. She supported another minelaying operation from 20 to 23 June. On 1 July, the minelayer SMS Albatross, escorted by the cruisers Roon, Augsburg, and Lübeck and seven destroyers, laid a minefield north of Bogskär. While returning to port, the flotilla separated into two sections; Augsburg, Albatross, and three destroyers made for Rixhöft while the remainder of the unit went to Libau. Augsburg and Albatross were intercepted by a powerful Russian squadron commanded by Rear Admiral Bakhirev, consisting of three armored and two light cruisers. Kommodore (Commodore) Johannes von Karpf, the flotilla commander, ordered the slower Albatross to steam for neutral Swedish waters and recalled Roon and Lübeck. Albatross was grounded off Gotland and Augsburg escaped, and the Russian squadron briefly engaged Roon before both sides broke contact. Upon being informed of the situation, Hopman sortied with Prinz Heinrich and Prinz Adalbert to support Karpf. While en route, the cruisers were intercepted by the British submarine E9, which scored a hit on Prinz Adalbert. Hopman broke off the operation and returned to Weichselmünde 1with the damaged cruiser.

From 11 to 12 July, Prinz Heinrich participated in a sortie toward Gotska Sandön, though the Germans failed to locate any Russian warships. Another sweep into the central Baltic, between Libau and Gotland, took place on 1 to 2 August, but again did not result in combat. German naval forces in the Baltic were reinforced by elements of the High Seas Fleet during the Battle of the Gulf of Riga in early August 1915. The Germans sought to drive out the Russians in the Gulf of Riga and to lay defensive minefields that would prevent a Russian counterattack. The battleships of the I Battle Squadron were the primary force, though Prinz Heinrich and the rest of the older vessels assigned to the Baltic fleet participated. On 10 August, Prinz Heinrich and Roon bombarded Russian defenses at Zerel, on the southernmost tip of the Sworbe Peninsula on the island of Ösel. Several Russian destroyers were anchored off Zerel and their crews did not expect the German bombardment. Prinz Heinrich and Roon damaged one of the destroyers during their attack, the former scoring two hits on the destroyer Sibirsky Strelok. A combination of tenacious Russian defense and reports of British submarines in the area—proved by the torpedoing of the battlecruiser Moltke on 19 August—caused the German navy to break off the operation.

In the meantime, Prinz Heinrich's boiler tubes were in need of replacement, so she was detached for repairs at Kiel, where she arrived on 11 August. The shipyards there were found to be overwhelmed with work, so Prinz Heinrich was transferred to the Blohm & Voss shipyard in Hamburg. Repairs were completed the following month, and she arrived back in Libau on 22 September. She took part in another minelaying sortie into the Baltic in the direction of Östergarn on 5–6 October. By this time, the German navy had begun to experience severe crew shortages, and so the Reichsmarineamt decided to decommission older, less combat-capable vessels. On 10 November, Prinz Heinrich left Libau for Kiel, where she arrived the following day. Her crew was reduced and she was assigned to the "Readiness Division" with Wittelsbach, some 419 men being taken from Prinz Heinrich. They were replaced with inexperienced naval cadets, and the ship was thereafter used as a guard ship anchored off Stein in the outer Kiel Fjord. By December, she had been moved closer to Kiel, and on 20 March 1916, she was taken into the imperial shipyard in Kiel to be decommissioned, which was done seven days later, and then disarmed. Both of her main battery guns were converted into "Theodor Karl" railway guns for use ashore. For the rest of the war, she served as a floating headquarters for Prince Heinrich, the commander in chief of naval forces in the Baltic. She was also used as a barracks ship and a tender. Beginning in 1918, she was also used to support the U-Kreuzer Flotilla, a unit composed of large U-boats intended for long-range commerce raiding operations. She was stricken from the naval register on 25 January 1920 and sold later that year. The ship was ultimately broken up for scrap at Audorf-Rendsburg.
