= Action of 19 August 1916 =

North Sea naval battle between the UK and German fleets

- Part of the First World War
- Map of the North Sea
Date	18–20 August 1916
Location	North Sea 56°N 03°E
Result	Indecisive

Belligerents
United Kingdom	Germany

Commanders and leaders
John Jellicoe; David Beatty	Reinhard Scheer; Franz von Hipper

Strength
29 battleships 6 battlecruisers 5 armoured cruisers 26 light cruisers 70 destroyers 1 minelayer 1 seaplane carrier 1 submarine	18 battleships 2 battlecruisers 7 light cruisers 56 torpedo boats 2 Zeppelins; 3 submarines

Casualties and losses
39 killed 2 light cruisers sunk	1 battleship damaged
- Location in the North Sea

The action of 19 August 1916 was one of two attempts in 1916 by the German High Seas Fleet to engage elements of the British Grand Fleet, following the mixed results of the Battle of Jutland, during the First World War. The lesson of Jutland for Germany had been the vital need for reconnaissance, to avoid the unexpected arrival of the Grand Fleet during a raid. Four Zeppelins were sent to scout the North Sea between Scotland and Norway for signs of British ships and four more scouted immediately ahead of German ships. Twenty-four German submarines kept watch off the English coast, in the southern North Sea and off the Dogger Bank.

== Background ==
The Germans claimed victory at the Battle of Jutland (31 May to 1 June 1916) yet the commander of the High Seas Fleet, Admiral Reinhard Scheer, felt it important that another raid should be mounted as quickly as possible to maintain morale in his severely battered fleet. It was decided that the raid should follow the pattern of previous ones, with the battlecruisers carrying out a dawn bombardment of an English town, this time Sunderland, a part of the British ship-building industry. Only the battlecruisers Moltke and Von der Tann were serviceable after Jutland and the force was bolstered by the battleships Bayern, Markgraf and Grosser Kurfürst. The remainder of the High Seas Fleet, comprising 15 dreadnought battleships, was to carry out close support 20 nmi (37 km; 23 mi) behind. The fleet sailed at 9:00 p.m. on 18 August from the Jade River.

== Prelude ==
=== Naval Intelligence ===
Information about the raid was obtained by British Naval Intelligence (Room 40) through decoded radio messages. Admiral Sir John Jellicoe, commander of the Grand Fleet, was on leave so had to be recalled; he boarded the light cruiser Royalist at Dundee to meet the fleet in the early hours of 19 August off the River Tay. In his absence, Admiral Cecil Burney took the fleet to sea on the afternoon of 18 August. Vice-Admiral David Beatty left the Firth of Forth with his squadron of six battlecruisers to meet the main fleet in the Long Forties, east of Aberdeen.

The Harwich Force of twenty destroyers and five light cruisers (Commodore Reginald Tyrwhitt) was ordered out, as were 25 British submarines which were stationed in likely areas to intercept German ships. The battlecruisers together with the 5th Battle Squadron of five fast battleships were stationed 30 nmi (56 km; 35 mi) ahead of the fleet to scout for the High Seas Fleet. The British moved south, seeking the German fleet but suffered the loss of HMS Nottingham, one of the light cruisers screening the battlecruiser group, which was hit by three torpedoes from submarine U-52 at 6:00 a.m. and sank, with the loss of 38 men.

=== Grand Fleet ===
At 6:15 a.m. Jellicoe received information from the Admiralty that one hour earlier, the Germans had been 200 nmi (370 km; 230 mi) to his south-east. The loss of Nottingham caused him to first head north for fear of endangering his other ships. No torpedo tracks or submarines had been seen, making it unclear whether the cause had been a submarine or a mine. He did not resume a south-easterly course until 9:00 a.m. when William Goodenough, commanding the light cruisers, reported that the cause had been a submarine attack. Further information from the Admiralty indicated that the battlecruisers would be within 40 nmi (74 km; 46 mi) of the main German fleet by 2:00 p.m. and Jellicoe increased to maximum speed. Weather conditions were good and there was still plenty of time for a fleet engagement before dark.

=== High Seas Fleet ===
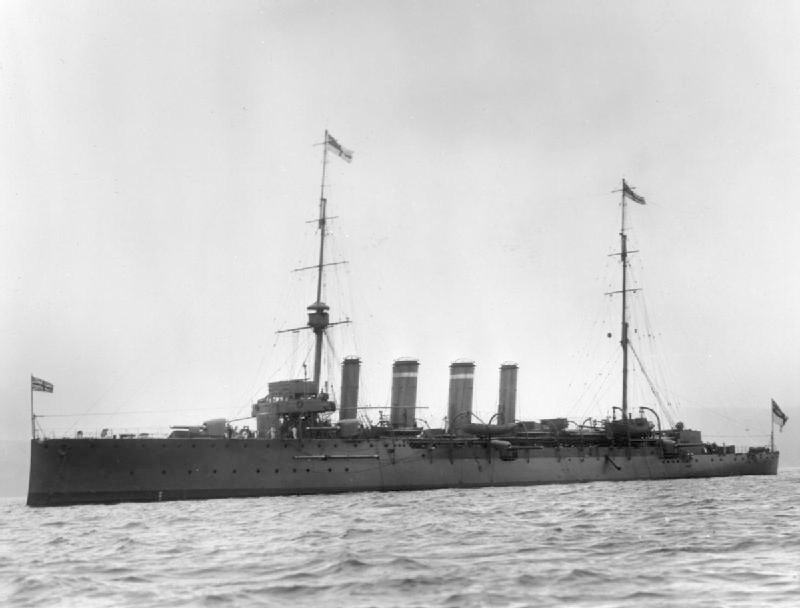
Town-class cruiser HMS Falmouth, sunk after torpedo attacks from two submarines

The German force had received reassurances about Jellicoe's position when a Zeppelin spotted the Grand Fleet heading north, away from Scheer, at the time it had been avoiding the possible minefield. Zeppelin L 13 sighted the Harwich force approximately 75 nmi (139 km; 86 mi) east north-east of Cromer, mistakenly identifying the cruisers as battleships. This was the sort of target Scheer was seeking and he changed course at 12:15 p.m. also to the south-east and away from the approaching British fleet. No further reports were received from Zeppelins about the British fleet but it was spotted by a U-boat 65 nmi (120 km; 75 mi) north of Scheer. The High Seas Fleet turned for home at 2:35 p.m. abandoning this potential target. By 4:00 p.m. Jellicoe had been told that Scheer had abandoned the operation and so turned north.

=== Room 40 ===
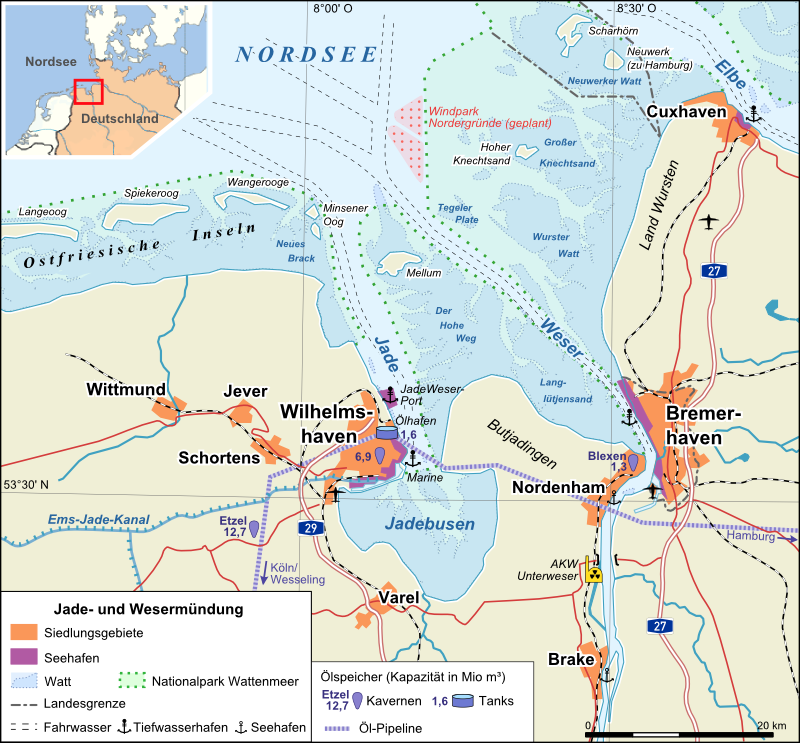
Jade Bay

Room 40, the British code-breaking organisation for the Navy was alerted to the possibility of another sortie by the High Seas Fleet by 15 August, "two and a half flotillas of destroyers were detailed as outposts at Schillig Roads, the seaward approaches to Jade Bay and the port of Wilhelmshaven but none for Heligoland. This procedure, being unusual, presaged something". The code-breakers discovered that the 1st and 3rd Battle Squadrons, at full strength and the 2nd and 4th Scouting Groups, two of the battle cruisers and the usual destroyer cover, had been collected in the Jade. Other characteristics of a German sortie were uncovered, minesweeping, instructions to light vessels and on the morning of 18 August, intelligence that the 3rd Battle Squadron would pass the outer Jade at 10:30 p.m. that evening. Airships had been ordered to take up positions in the North Sea.

The U-boats had sailed and formed three groups off the north coast of England and some off Aberdeen but their patrol areas had not been uncovered and more U-boats were in the southern North Sea. It was not certain that the High Seas Fleet had sailed until Westfalen was torpedoed by a British submarine at 5:05 a.m. on 19 August about 60 nmi (110 km; 69 mi) north of Terschelling. The submarine report was pinpointed by British shore-based direction finders. The Grand Fleet had sailed within two hours of the Room 40s decrypt on the morning of 18 August but Jellicoe, who was at sea with the Grand Fleet, was not informed until 7:00 a.m.

The British had sailed before the Germans but the cruiser Nottingham was torpedoed and sunk around 6:00 a.m. on 19 August. The British first thought that Nottingham had struck a mine and turned to the north to avoid a possible minefield, which cost the Grand Fleet four hours, until it was certain that the cruiser had been torpedoed. Scheer had broken wireless silence and been located by D/F stations, even though the signal had not been decrypted, due to a German key change at midnight on 18/19 August. The High Seas Fleet had received a reconnaissance report from a Zeppelin watching for a surprise attack from the south. Zeppelin L.13 spotted the Harwich Force and mistakenly identified it as a battleship squadron. Scheer turned south-east, hoping to catch an isolated part of the Grand Fleet, inadvertently turning away from the real position of the British. Scheer was also misled by a report from U-53, which had spotted the Grand Fleet during its run north to avoid a possible minefield. Had Scheer not turned south towards Harwich Force, there might have been a fleet engagement.

Harwich Force, having failed to find the High Seas Fleet, turned south-east and missed the Germans to the north. At 2:13 p.m. Scheer received another signal from U-53 which had observed the Grand Fleet steaming south about 65 nmi (120 km; 75 mi) from the High Seas Fleet. At 2:33 p.m. Scheer turned east-south-east for home and at 3:46 p.m. Jellicoe was informed by the Admiralty that there was no prospect of catching up the High Seas Fleet and reversed course, losing a second cruiser to a U-boat before he reached Scapa Flow. Harwich Force saw the High Seas Fleet at 6:00 p.m. but failed to overhaul them before a full moon rose, removing the concealment necessary for a torpedo attack on such a superior force.

=== Other engagements ===
A second cruiser attached to the battlecruiser squadron, HMS Falmouth, was hit by two torpedoes from U-66 at 4:52 p.m. Falmouth managed to raise steam and made slowly for Humber, escorted by four destroyers; in the early hours a tug arrived and took the ship in tow. Taking the shortest route to the Humber put the ship on a bearing which took it along the Flamborough Head U-boat line. At noon, the ship, now escorted by eight destroyers, was hit by two torpedoes fired by U-63 (Korvettenkapitän Otto Schultze). Falmouth remained afloat for another eight hours then sank 5 nmi (9.3 km; 5.8 mi) south of Flamborough Head. By 5:45 p.m. the Harwich Force had sighted German ships but was too far behind to attack before nightfall and abandoned the chase. The British submarine HMS E23 (Lieutenant-Commander R. R. Turner) managed to hit the German battleship SMS Westfalen north of Terschelling at 5:05 a.m. on 19 August but the ship reached port.

== Aftermath ==
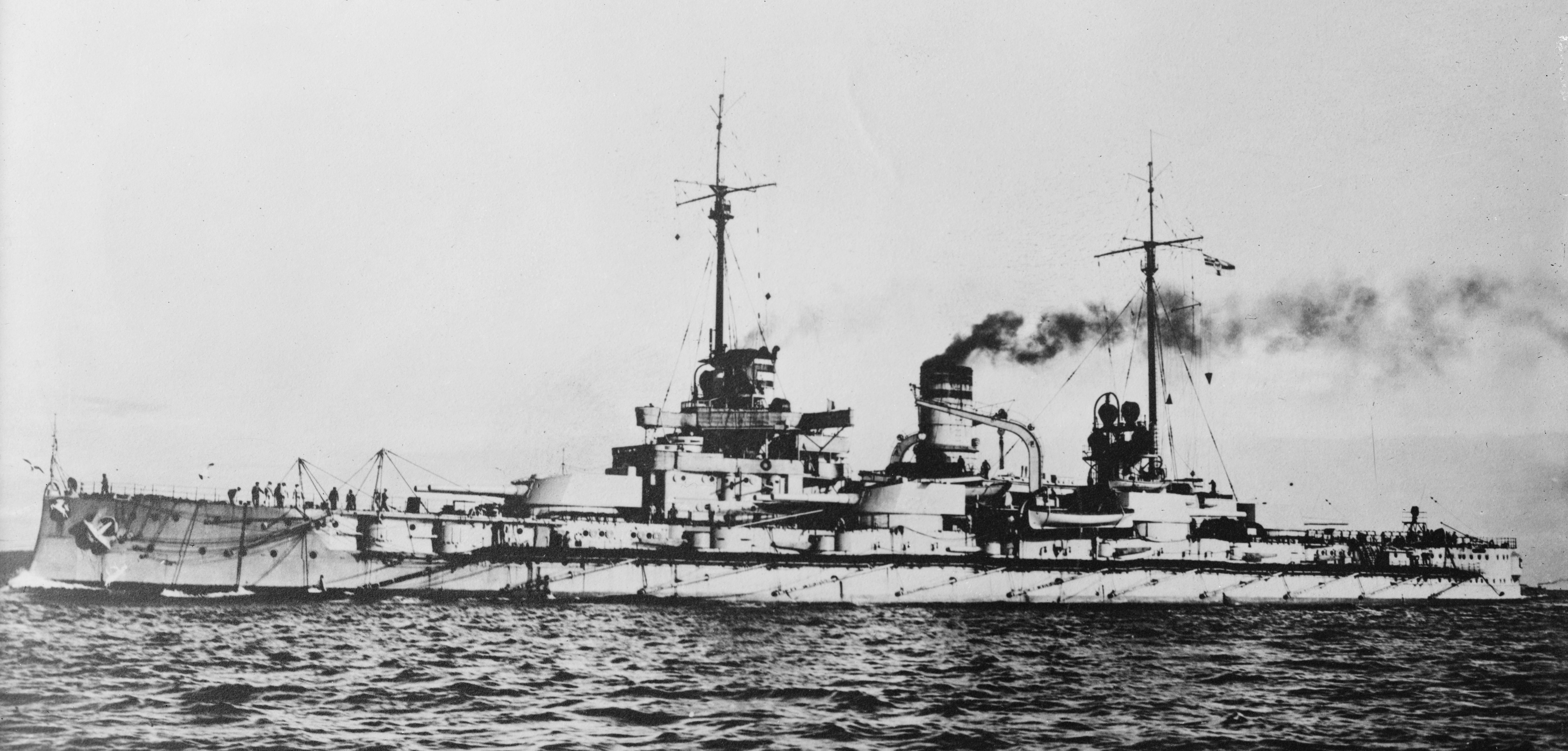
Nassau-class battleship SMS Westfalen damaged by a torpedo from HMS E23

On 13 September, a conference was held between Jellicoe and the Chief of the Admiralty War Staff, Vice-Admiral Sir Henry Oliver, on Iron Duke to discuss recent events. It was provisionally decided that it was unsafe to conduct fleet operations south of latitude 55.5° North (approximately level with Horns Rev and where the battle of Jutland had taken place). Jellicoe took the view that a destroyer shortage precluded operations further south but that it was feasible to operate west of Longitude 4° East should there be a good opportunity of engaging the German fleet in daylight. The fleet should not sail further south than the Dogger Bank until a complete destroyer screen was available, except in exceptional circumstances, such as the chance to engage the High Seas Fleet with a tactical advantage or to intercept a German invasion fleet.

On 23 September the Admiralty endorsed the conclusions of the meeting due to the effect of submarines and mines on surface ship operations. Scheer was unimpressed by the Zeppelin reconnaissance, only three had spotted anything and of their seven reports four had been wrong. This was the last occasion on which the German fleet sailed so far west into the North Sea. On 6 October, the German government resumed attacks against merchant vessels by submarine, which meant the U-boat fleet was no longer available for combined attacks against surface vessels. From 18 to 19 October, Scheer led a brief sortie into the North Sea of which British intelligence gave advance warning; the Grand Fleet declined to prepare an ambush, staying in port with steam raised, ready to sail. The German sortie was abandoned after a few hours when SMS München was hit by a torpedo fired by E38 (Lieutenant-Commander J. de B. Jessop) and it was feared other submarines might be in the area.

Scheer suffered further difficulties when in November he sailed with Moltke and a division of dreadnoughts to rescue the U-boats U-20 and U-30, that were stranded on the Danish coast. The submarine HMS J1 (Commander Noel Laurence) managed to torpedo the battleships Grosser Kurfürst and Kronprinz. The failure of these operations reinforced the belief, created at Jutland, that the risks were too great for such tactics, because of the danger from submarines and mines.
