= SMS Berlin =

Light cruiser of the German Imperial Navy

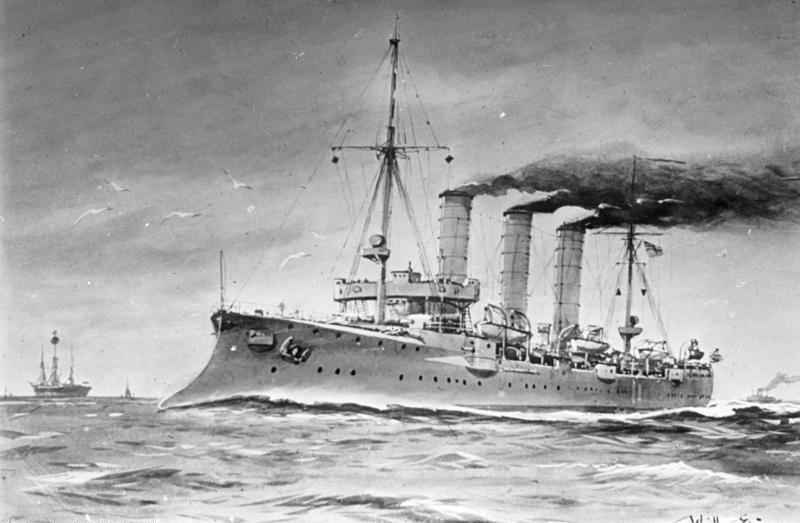
- Pre-war illustration of Berlin

History

German Empire
- Name: Berlin
- Laid down: 1902
- Launched: 22 September 1903
- Commissioned: 4 April 1905
- Decommissioned: 27 March 1929
- Stricken: 1 October 1935
- Fate: Scuttled, 1946

General characteristics
- Class & type: Bremen-class cruiser
- Displacement: Normal: 3,278 t (3,226 long tons); Full load: 3,792 t (3,732 long tons)
- Length: Length overall: 111.1 meters (365 ft)
- Beam: 13.3 m (43.6 ft)
- Draft: 5.51 m (18.1 ft)
- Installed power: 10 × water-tube boilers; 10,000 PS (9,900 ihp)
- Propulsion: 2 × screw propellers; 2 × triple-expansion steam engines
- Speed: 22 knots (41 km/h; 25 mph)
- Range: 4,270 nmi (7,910 km; 4,910 mi) at 12 kn (22 km/h; 14 mph)
- Complement: 14 officers; 274–287 enlisted men
- Armament: 10 × 10.5 cm (4.1 in) SK L/40 guns; 10 × 3.7 cm (1.5 in) Maxim guns; 2 × 45 cm (17.7 in) torpedo tubes
- Armor: Deck: 80 mm (3.1 in); Conning tower: 100 mm (3.9 in); Gun shields: 50 mm (2 in)

SMS Berlin (Note: "SMS" stands for "Seiner Majestät Schiff" (German: His Majesty's Ship).) was the third member of the seven-vessel Bremen class of light cruisers, built for the German Kaiserliche Marine (Imperial Navy) in the early 1900s. She and her sister ships were ordered under the 1898 Naval Law that required new cruisers be built to replace obsolete vessels in the fleet. The design for the Bremen class was derived from the preceding Gazelle class, utilizing a larger hull that allowed for additional boilers to increase speed. Named for the German capital of Berlin, the ship was armed with a main battery of ten 10.5 cm (4.1 in) guns and had a top speed of 22 knots (41 km/h; 25 mph).

Berlin served with the main fleet's scouting forces for the majority of her early career. Between her commissioning in 1905 and 1910, the ship's annual training routine consisted of unit and fleet training exercises, visits to foreign countries, and in 1908 and 1909, several long-distance training cruises into the central Atlantic Ocean. In 1911, the ship was involved in the Agadir Crisis over the French annexation of part of Morocco, which resulted in a diplomatic defeat for Germany. Berlin was reduced to reserve status in late 1912, remaining out of service until the start of World War I in July 1914. She was used to support German coastal defense forces and to scout for the High Seas Fleet. On two different occasions, she had to tow her sister ships during the war: Danzig after she struck naval mines; and München after having been torpedoed by a submarine. Berlin was reduced to a tender in early 1917 and saw no further active service for the rest of the war.

Among the handful of vessels permitted to Weimar Germany by the Treaty of Versailles, Berlin was initially used as a stationary training vessel before being modernized between 1921 and 1922. She thereafter served as a training ship for naval cadets, and over the course of the mid-1920s, embarked a series of long-distance training cruises. The furthest of these, lasting from late 1927 to early 1929, saw the ship voyage as far as East Asia. Berlin was decommissioned in March 1929 and kept in reserve until 1935, when she was converted into a barracks ship, a role the vessel filled through World War II. After the war, she was loaded with chemical weapons and scuttled in the Skagerrak in 1946.

== Design ==
The German 1898 Naval Law called for the replacement of the fleet's older cruising vessels—steam corvettes, unprotected cruisers, and avisos—with modern light cruisers. The first tranche of vessels to fulfill this requirement, the Gazelle class, were designed to serve both as fleet scouts and as station ships in Germany's colonial empire. They provided the basis for subsequent designs, beginning with the Bremen class that was designed in 1901–1903. The principle improvements consisted of a larger hull that allowed for an additional pair of boilers and a higher top speed.

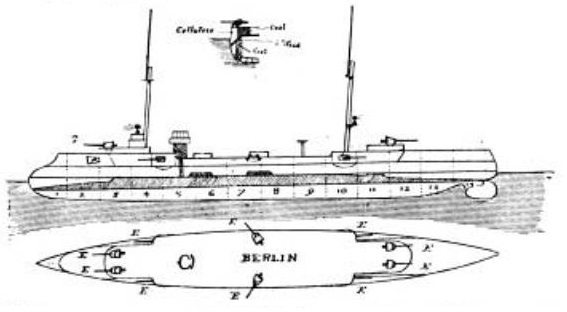
Plan and profile of the Bremen class

Berlin was 111.1 meters (365 ft) long overall and had a beam of 13.3 m (44 ft) and a draft of 5.51 m (18.1 ft) forward. She displaced 3,278 metric tons (3,226 long tons) as designed and up to 3,792 t (3,732 long tons) at full load. The ship had a minimal superstructure, which consisted of a small conning tower and bridge structure. Her hull had a raised forecastle and quarterdeck, along with a pronounced ram bow. She was fitted with two pole masts. She had a crew of 14 officers and 274–287 enlisted men, which varied over the course of her career.

Her propulsion system consisted of two triple-expansion steam engines driving a pair of screw propellers, with steam provided by ten coal-fired Marine-type water-tube boilers. The boilers were vented through three funnels located amidships. Her propulsion system was rated at 10,000 metric horsepower (9,900 ihp) for a top speed of 22 knots (41 km/h; 25 mph). Berlin carried up to 860 t (850 long tons) of coal, which gave her a range of 4,270 nautical miles (7,910 km; 4,910 mi) at 12 knots (22 km/h; 14 mph).

The ship was armed with a main battery of ten 10.5 cm (4.1 in) SK L/40 guns on single mounts. Two were placed side by side forward on the forecastle; six were located on the broadside, three on either side; and two were placed side by side aft. The guns could engage targets out to 12,200 m (13,300 yd). They were supplied with 1,500 rounds of ammunition, for 150 shells per gun. For defense against torpedo boats, she carried ten 3.7 cm (1.5 in) Maxim guns on individual mounts. She was also equipped with two 45 cm (17.7 in) torpedo tubes with five torpedoes. They were submerged in the hull on the broadside. In 1915, Berlin was modified to carry 80 naval mines.

The ship was protected by a curved armored deck that was up to 80 mm (3.1 in) thick; it sloped down at the sides to provide a measure of protection against enemy fire. The conning tower had 100 mm (3.9 in) thick sides, and the guns were protected by 50 mm (2 in) thick gun shields.

== Service history ==
=== Construction – 1910 ===
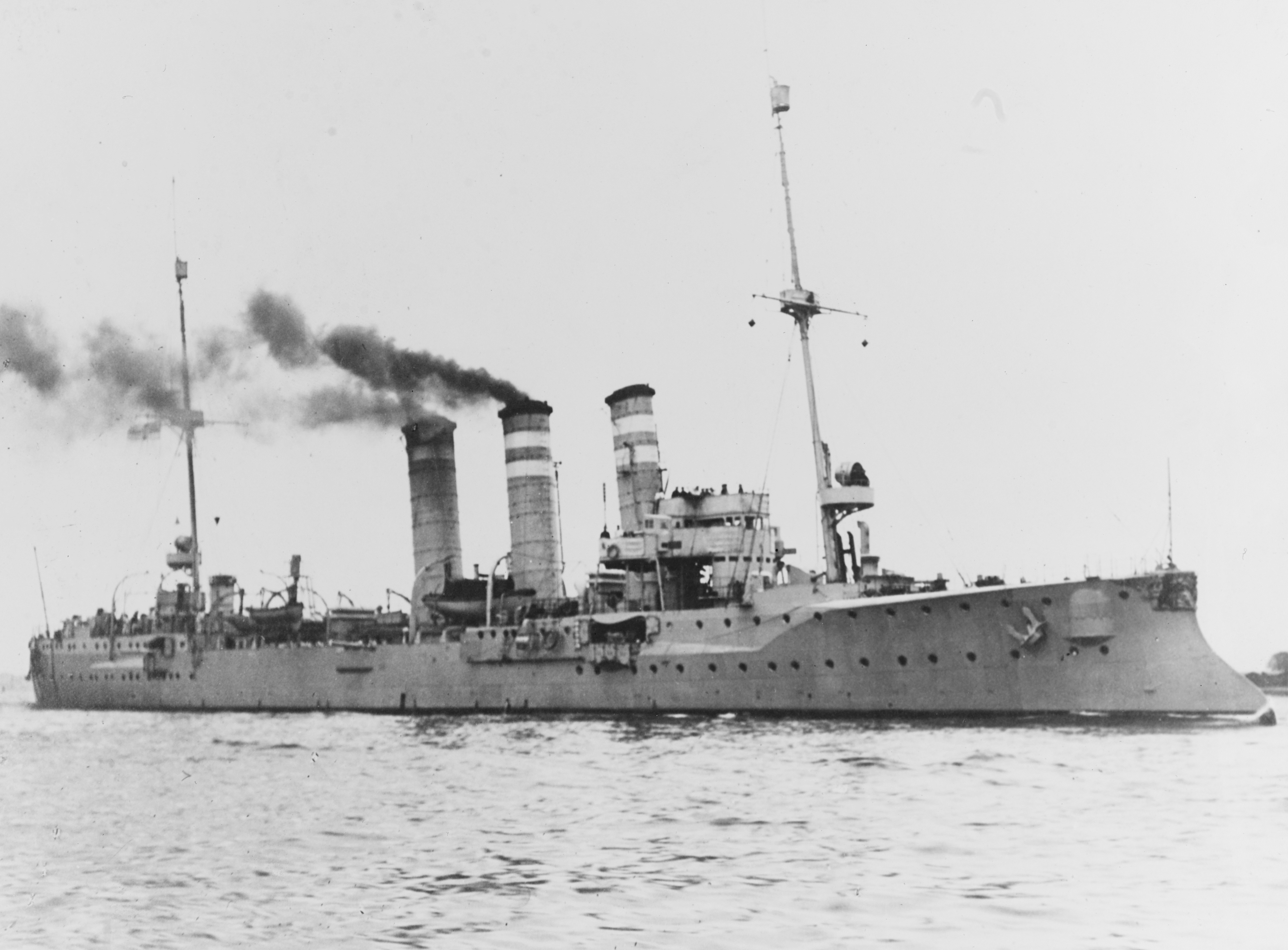
Berlin early in her career

Berlin was ordered under the contract name Ersatz Zieten (Note: German warships were ordered under provisional names. Additions to the fleet were given a single letter; ships intended to replace older or lost vessels were ordered as "Ersatz (name of the ship to be replaced)". In the case of the Bremen class, which were ordered under the major construction program of the Naval Law of 1898, four were added as additions, while the remaining three were ordered to replace old ships.) and was laid down at the Kaiserliche Werft (Imperial Shipyard) in Danzig in 1902. She was launched on 22 September 1903, and the Mayor of Berlin, Martin Kirschner, gave a speech and christened the ship. After completing fitting-out work, she was commissioned for sea trials on 4 April 1905. Initial testing lasted until 15 June, and she immediately thereafter joined Hohenzollern, the yacht of Kaiser Wilhelm II, on a voyage that began on 18 June. The ships went to a series of sailing regattas over the course of the next few weeks; the first was on the Elbe river, followed by Kiel Week, and finally Travemünde Week. The two ships then embarked on the Kaiser's annual summer cruise in July, during which they visited Gefle, Norway, from 12 to 16 July. There, Wilhelm II was met by King Oscar II of what was then Sweden–Norway. Berlin then escorted Hohenzollern for a cruise into the Baltic Sea that culminated with a visit to the island of Björkö, off the coast of Finland; there, Wilhelm met his cousin, Tsar Nicholas II of Russia between 23 and 24 July. The voyage concluded with a visit to Copenhagen, Denmark, from 31 July to 3 August, where Wilhelm met with King Christian IX of Denmark. Berlin arrived back in Kiel, German, on 8 August.

The ship was then assigned to the fleet, though she did not take part in the annual fleet maneuvers held in late August and early September. Following the conclusion of the exercises, Korvettenkapitän (KK—Corvette Captain) Hugo Kraft took command of the ship. She officially joined the fleet's Reconnaissance Unit on 29 September, taking the place of the light cruiser Amazone that was decommissioned at that time; Amazone's crew transferred to Berlin, replacing her initial crew that had been assembled just for trials. Berlin then joined the other vessels of the Reconnaissance Unit for squadron training in the Baltic in November. Fleet maneuvers in the North Sea followed in December. The years 1906 and 1907 consisted of a similar routine of training exercises: unit exercises were held in the North Sea and the Skagerrak early in the year, followed by fleet maneuvers in May and June, summer cruises in July and August, and the annual large-scale fleet maneuvers held every August and September. Further unit and fleet maneuvers were conducted toward the end of both years. In October 1907, Fregattenkapitän (FK—Frigate Captain) Arthur Tapken relieved Kraft as the ship's commander.

At the urging of the commander of the High Seas Fleet, Admiral Prince Heinrich of Prussia, the fleet conducted four major training cruises into the Atlantic Ocean in early 1908 and 1909. In both years, the fleet cruised to Spain twice, in February and July. During the February cruises, Berlin visited Vigo, Spain, and during the July cruises, she stopped in A Coruña, Spain, and Horta, Azores in 1908 and Vilagarcía in 1909. Berlin escorted Wilhelm II on another cruise abroad, this time with the Kaiser aboard the fleet flagship, the pre-dreadnought battleship Deutschland, on a cruise to Helgoland and then to Bremerhaven that lasted from 8 to 11 March 1908. The routine of unit and fleet maneuvers followed the same pattern as in previous years. In 1910, Admiral Henning von Holtzendorff replaced Heinrich as the fleet commander, and he ended the program of Atlantic cruises, instead preferring to focus on training exercises in the North and Baltic Seas. The year's summer cruise returned to Norwegian waters. In September, KK Heinrich Löhlein took command of the ship.

=== Agadir Crisis ===
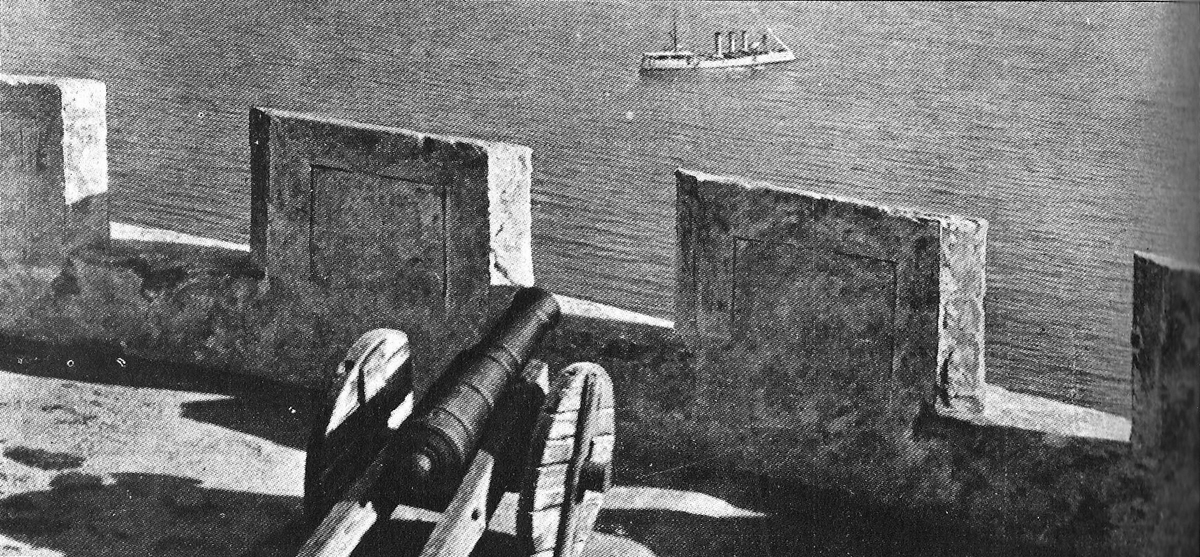
Berlin seen from the kasbah of Agadir during the Agadir Crisis in 1911

The year 1911 began with a squadron cruise to Norway. In May, Berlin was dry-docked for several weeks for maintenance, after which she rejoined the fleet for maneuvers in the Baltic Sea that ended with a cruise back to the North Sea and a visit to Emden. On 27 June, Berlin's crew received orders to deploy to the coast of west Africa during the Agadir Crisis to replace the gunboat Panther there. Earlier that year, French troops had occupied Fez, the capital of then-independent Morocco, prompting German fears that France planned to annex the country in violation of the Algeciras Conference of 1906. Germany sought compensation elsewhere for its colonial empire. Berlin got underway on 28 June and passed through the Kaiser Wilhelm Canal. She steamed through the Strait of Dover during the night of 30 June – 1 July and reached Agadir, Morocco, three days later. Since there was no way to coal Berlin in Moroccan waters, the German command decided to retain Panther so that a German warship could be kept on station at all times. On 20 July, the gunboat Eber arrived to relieve Panther, allowing her to return to Germany. While they operated in Agadir, Berlin and Eber made alternating trips to Las Palmas in the Canary Islands to replenish their coal stocks.

While Berlin was in Agadir, a French Army unit disguised as merchants entered the port and raised the French tricolor over the city's kasbah and announced the French annexation of the port. Löhlein telegraphed the German command in Berlin to determine what course of action he should take in view of the French provocation, and he was instructed to avoid conflict. The dispute was eventually resolved diplomatically, and the French flag was temporarily removed from the kasbah, though the crisis was resolved with Germany accepting the French position in Morocco and marked a serious defeat for German interests in Africa. The deployment was marked by trouble communicating between Berlin and the long-range Nauen Transmitter Station in Germany, as French stations in the region would not relay German signals; Berlin was forced to rely on merchant ships fitted with transmitters in the area to communicate with the German government.

By October, the situation had calmed, and the planned change of command for Berlin was able to take place as scheduled on 3 November, with FK Wilhelm Tägert replacing Löhlein. Berlin and Eber were thereafter recalled, and the cruiser got underway on 28 November. On the way back, she visited Mogador, Casablanca, and Tangiers in French North Africa. While passing through the Bay of Biscay, she encountered a severe storm that damaged the ship and delayed her voyage north by five days. She had to stop at Portsmouth, Britain, to coal and repair some of the storm damage. She passed back through the Strait of Dover on 12 December and arrived back in Kiel two days later.

After returning home, Berlin was assigned to the Reconnaissance Unit. She participated in squadron and fleet maneuvers held in the North Sea in February and March 1912. Another series of exercises were held in the Baltic in July and August, followed by the annual fleet maneuvers in August and September. On 27 September, she arrived in Kiel where Tägert and part of the crew left the ship to prepare the new cruiser Strassburg to be commissioned on 1 October. The rest of Berlin's crew took the ship to Wilhelmshaven, where she was decommissioned on 29 October and placed in reserve, where she remained through mid-1914.

=== World War I ===
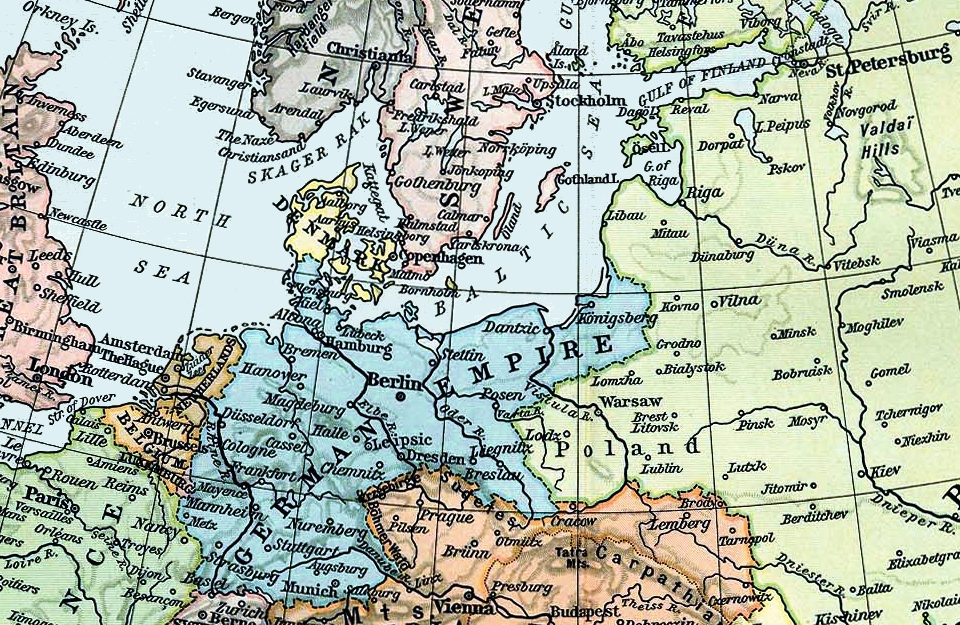
Map of the North and Baltic Seas in 1911

With the outbreak of World War I in July 1914, Berlin was reactivated as part of Germany's mobilization for the conflict. She was recommissioned on 17 August under the command of FK Friedrich von Bülow and conducted a short period of sea trials and individual training from 3 to 17 September. While she was still working up, Berlin was assigned as the flotilla leader for the torpedo boat flotilla stationed in Jade Bay. Bülow at that time commanded both the ship and the flotilla, but on 17 September, she was instead transferred to IV Scouting Group, her place in the Jade flotilla being taken by the coastal defense ship Siegfried. IV Scouting Group then assembled in the western Baltic for training exercises. The ships were temporarily allocated to the Coastal Defense Division of the Baltic Sea and were tasked with patrolling the area off Langeland in the Danish Straits from 27 September to 2 October. The next day, the ships were transferred to the German Bight, where they supported the patrols guarding the German North Sea coast.

Berlin remained there through 24 October 1915, though the rest of IV Scouting Group typically operated with the High Seas Fleet through 1915. During this period, Berlin joined the ships of II Scouting Group to cover a minelaying operation in the area of the Swarte Bank from 17 to 18 April. During another minelaying operation off the Dogger Bank on 18 May, Berlin's sister ship Danzig struck a British mine and Berlin took her under tow until the tugboat Boreas arrived and took over. Berlin was overhauled between 30 July and 28 August and she was retrofitted to carry eighty mines. The ship was detached from IV Scouting Group on 24 October and transferred to the Baltic Sea Naval Forces, being moved to Kiel that day. She got underway the next day in company with the light cruiser Stuttgart and V Torpedo-boat Flotilla, bound for Libau. After arriving, she joined the Reconnaissance Ships of the Eastern Baltic and then steamed north to Windau, where she replaced her sister ship Bremen. Berlin had to tow Danzig, which had struck another mine, back to Neufahrwassar from 25 to 26 November.

In late 1915 and early 1916, the Germans significantly reduced naval forces in the Baltic and Berlin was transferred back to IV Scouting Group. She left the eastern Baltic on 6 January 1916 in company with the pre-dreadnoughts Braunschweig and Mecklenburg and X Torpedo-boat Flotilla and arrived in Kiel the next day. From there, she proceeded through the Kaiser Wilhelm Canal to Wilhelmshaven, arriving the following day. After completing a short overhaul there, she rejoined the unit on 3 February and resumed patrol duties in the German Bight. She participated in a pair of fleet sorties on 3–4 and 25–26 March, both of which went as far as the Amrun Bank, and neither of which encountered British forces. On 18 May, she was dry-docked for another overhaul, so she was unavailable when the fleet sortied for the operation that resulted in the Battle of Jutland on 31 May – 1 June. Berlin left the shipyard on 8 June.

While on patrol in company with her sister München on 19 October, Berlin was attacked by the British submarine HMS E38. The torpedo launched at Berlin missed, but the one that E38 launched at München found its mark. Berlin took her damaged sister under tow back to port, though she was relieved the next day by a shipyard tugboat. In December, Berlin was transferred to II Scouting Group, but her stay there was short-lived, since on 14 January 1917 she was reassigned to coastal patrol duty in the North Sea. In early February she moved to Kiel and then to Danzig on the 5th; there, she was decommissioned on 11 February. She was disarmed and converted into a tender for the commander of coastal defense forces in the Baltic, serving in that role from 26 April 1918 to the end of the war in November.

=== Later career ===
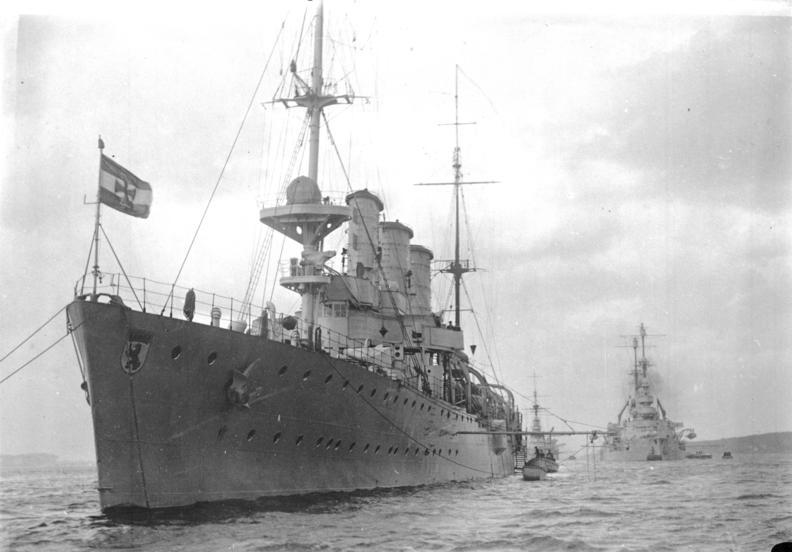
Berlin after her modernization in 1921–1923

Berlin was among the six light cruisers Germany was permitted to retain by the Treaty of Versailles that ended the war. She was initially used as a training hulk for boiler room crews; the ship was moved to Kiel on 16 December 1919 for this role, which she filled for the next year and a half. During this period, Oberleutnant zur See (First Lieutenant) Clamor von Trotha served as the ship's commander from December 1920 to April 1921, when he was briefly replaced by Kapitänleutnant (Captain Lieutenant) Hans Walther. By mid-1921, the post-war German navy, the Reichsmarine (Navy of the Realm) had decided to reactivate the vessel to serve as a training ship for naval cadets and she was transferred to Wilhelmshaven, where she was decommissioned on 10 June and dry-docked for a thorough overhaul and modernization. The work included replacing her original ram bow with a more modern clipper bow. She was recommissioned on 2 July 1922, under the command of Kapitän zur See (KzS—Captain at Sea) Wilfried von Loewenfeld, and was assigned to the Naval Training Inspectorate. Later that year, she embarked on a training cruise that included port calls in Scandinavian and Dutch cities. The following year saw a lengthy training cruise during which the ship visited Norway, Iceland, and the Faroe Islands. In October 1923, KzS Paul Wülfing von Ditten replaced Loewenfeld.

On 15 January 1924, Berlin embarked on the first major overseas cruise by a German warship since the end of the war. She traveled into the central Atlantic, visiting Ponta Delgada in the Azores, Santa Cruz de Tenerife and Las Palmas in the Canary Islands, Funchal in Madeira, and Cartagena, Spain. She arrived back in Kiel on 18 March. The ship took part in the annual fleet maneuvers held in August and September that year, during which she hosted Otto Gessler, the Minister of the Reichswehr. The next major training cruise began on 1 November and went as far as Central and South America. Berlin stopped in Santa Cruz de Tenerife; Saint Thomas, U.S. Virgin Islands; Cartagena, Colombia; Veracruz, Mexico; Havana, Cuba; La Guaira, Venezuela; San Juan, Puerto Rico; and Ponta Delgada during the voyage. While passing through the Bay of Biscay on the way back to Germany, she encountered a severe storm. Berlin reached Kiel on 16 March 1925. KzS Ernst Junkermann relieved Ditten as the ship's commander in July.

The next major cruise began on 9 September; this time, Berlin cruised as far as the western coast of South America. She visited Ponta Delgada; Hamilton, Bermuda; Port au Prince, Haiti; Colón, Venezuela; Puerto Madryn, Argentina; Guayaquil, Ecuador; Callao, Peru; and several ports in Chile, including Valparaíso, Corral, Talcahuano, and Punta Arenas. After returning to the Atlantic, she stopped in Mar del Plata and Buenos Aires, Argentina; Montevideo, Uruguay; and Rio de Janeiro, Brazil. She then steamed back to European waters, stopping in Vigo, Spain, before arriving in Kiel on 22 March 1926. Her crew was reduced there until 25 September, since the new light cruiser Emden would be taking her place as a training vessel. At the same time, FK Hans Kolbe took command of the vessel. Berlin was transferred from the Naval Training Inspectorate to the Marinestation der Ostsee (Baltic Sea Naval Station) for service with the fleet. She and the other vessels of the fleet conducted a long-range cruise to the central Atlantic between April and June 1927, which included visits to Santa Cruz de Tenerife, various ports in the Azores, and cities in Portugal and Spain. While in Horta, Spain, on 19 May, Berlin assisted a Portuguese sailing ship that had been in danger of sinking.

After the fleet maneuvers that concluded with a naval review for President Paul von Hindenburg on 14 September, Hindenburg moved from the battleship Schleswig-Holstein to Berlin, which carried him to Königsberg in East Prussia. After Berlin's sister Hamburg was decommissioned earlier that year on 30 June, the decision was made to return Berlin to the Naval Training Inspectorate. The ship was reassigned on 1 October, and she began her furthest training cruise on 1 December. This voyage, which lasted some fifteen months, took the ship as far as East Asia. During the cruise, she stopped in Fremantle, Australia. Berlin arrived back in Cuxhaven on 7 March 1929; from there, she was moved to Kiel, where she was decommissioned for the last time on 27 March. She remained in reserve until 1 October 1935, at which time the German navy, by then renamed the Kriegsmarine (War Navy), struck the ship from the naval register and then employed the vessel as a barracks ship in Kiel. There, she survived World War II; in the aftermath of the war, she was loaded with chemical weapons and on 28 May 1945, she sailed from Kiel with a number of smaller vessels. She was then scuttled in the Skaggerak on 31 May 1946. (Note: The historians Adrian Dodson and Serena Cant express doubt that Berlin was used to dispose of chemical weapons, pointing to the fact that the ship was scuttled with demolition charges, which was not done with vessels that did carry chemical weapons to avoid dispersing the toxic gas. They note that in official records, all vessels used to sink the weapons were cargo ships or unfinished warships that had significant internal storage. They state that while a number of sources repeat the claim that Berlin (and other warships) were used for the chemical disposal effort, they seem to repeat the claim cited in Gröner.)
