= SMS München =

Light cruiser of the German Imperial Navy

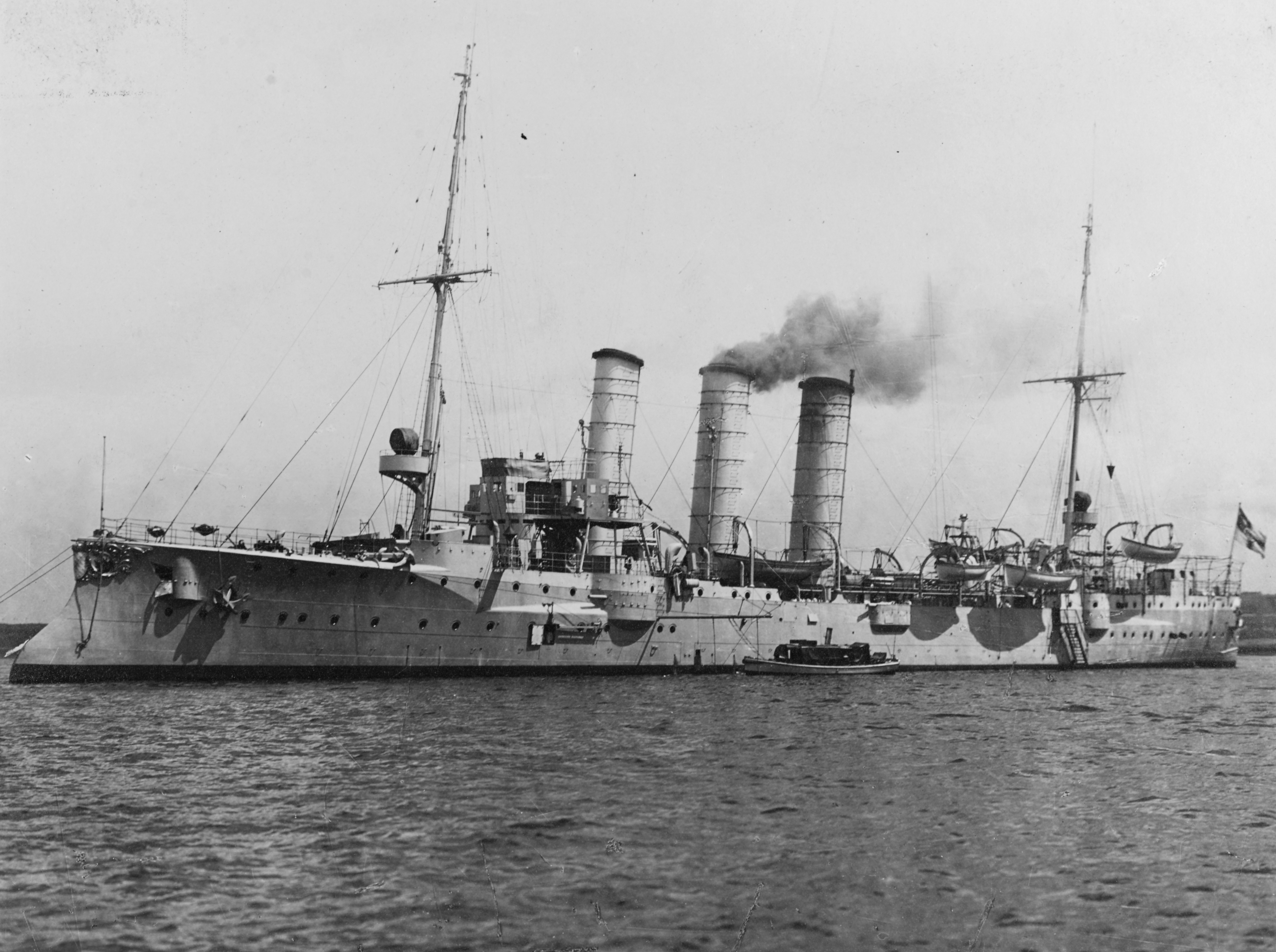
- A prewar photograph of München

History

German Empire
- Name: München
- Namesake: Munich
- Laid down: 18 August 1903
- Launched: 30 April 1904
- Commissioned: 10 January 1905
- Decommissioned: November 1916
- Stricken: 5 November 1919
- Fate: Sunk as target, 28 October 1921

General characteristics
- Class & type: Bremen-class cruiser
- Displacement: Normal: 3,278 t (3,226 long tons); Full load: 3,780 t (3,720 long tons)
- Length: Length overall: 111.1 meters (365 ft)
- Beam: 13.3 m (43.6 ft)
- Draft: 5.47 m (17.9 ft)
- Installed power: 10 × water-tube boilers; 10,000 PS (9,900 ihp)
- Propulsion: 2 × screw propellers; 2 × triple-expansion steam engines
- Speed: 22 knots (41 km/h; 25 mph)
- Range: 4,690 nmi (8,690 km; 5,400 mi) at 12 kn (22 km/h; 14 mph)
- Complement: 14 officers; 274–287 enlisted men
- Armament: 10 × 10.5 cm (4.1 in) SK L/40 guns; 14 × 3.7 cm (1.5 in) Maxim guns; 2 × 45 cm (17.7 in) torpedo tubes
- Armor: Deck: 80 mm (3.1 in); Conning tower: 100 mm (3.9 in); Gun shields: 50 mm (2 in)

SMS München ('His Majesty's Ship München') (Note: "SMS" stands for "Seiner Majestät Schiff" (German: His Majesty's Ship).) was the fifth of seven Bremen-class cruisers of the Imperial German Navy, named after the city of Munich. She was built by AG Weser in Bremen, starting in 1903, launched in April 1904, and commissioned in January 1905. Armed with a main battery of ten 10.5 cm (4.1 in) guns and two 45 cm (18 in) torpedo tubes, München was capable of a top speed of 22.5 knots (41.7 km/h; 25.9 mph).

München served with the fleet for the majority of her career, and saw extensive service during World War I, including at the Battle of Jutland on 31 May – 1 June 1916. There, she engaged British light cruisers on two instances, and was damaged in both; she contributed to the damaging of the cruiser HMS Southampton during the latter engagement. München was torpedoed by the British submarine HMS E38 on 19 October 1916, and was subsequently withdrawn from service. She spent the final year of the war as a barracks ship, and was surrendered as a war prize to the British in 1920. München was later sunk as a torpedo target.

== Design ==
The German 1898 Naval Law called for the replacement of the fleet's older cruising vessels—steam corvettes, unprotected cruisers, and avisos—with modern light cruisers. The first tranche of vessels to fulfill this requirement, the Gazelle class, were designed to serve both as fleet scouts and as station ships in Germany's colonial empire. They provided the basis for subsequent designs, beginning with the Bremen class that was designed in 1901–1903. The principle improvements consisted of a larger hull that allowed for an additional pair of boilers and a higher top speed.

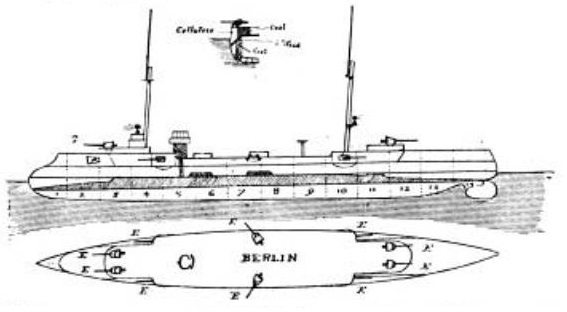
Plan and profile of the Bremen class

München was 111.1 meters (365 ft) long overall and had a beam of 13.3 m (44 ft) and a draft of 5.47 m (17.9 ft) forward. She displaced 3,278 metric tons (3,226 long tons) as designed and up to 3,780 t (3,720 long tons) at full load. The ship had a minimal superstructure, which consisted of a small conning tower and bridge structure. Her hull had a raised forecastle and quarterdeck, along with a pronounced ram bow. She was fitted with two pole masts. She had a crew of 14 officers and 274–287 enlisted men.

Her propulsion system consisted of two triple-expansion steam engines driving a pair of screw propellers. Steam was provided by ten coal-fired Marine-type water-tube boilers, which were vented through three funnels located amidships. Her propulsion system was rated at 10,000 metric horsepower (9,900 ihp) for a top speed of 22 knots (41 km/h; 25 mph). München carried up to 860 t (850 long tons) of coal, which gave her a range of 4,690 nautical miles (8,690 km; 5,400 mi) at 12 knots (22 km/h; 14 mph).

The ship was armed with a main battery of ten 10.5 cm (4.1 in) SK L/40 guns in single mounts. Two were placed side by side forward on the forecastle; six were located on the broadside, three on either side; and two were placed side by side aft. The guns could engage targets out to 12,200 m (13,300 yd). They were supplied with 1,500 rounds of ammunition, for 150 shells per gun. For defense against torpedo boats, she carried fourteen 3.7 cm (1.5 in) Maxim guns in individual mounts. She was also equipped with two 45 cm (17.7 in) torpedo tubes with five torpedoes. They were submerged in the hull on the broadside. München was also fitted to carry fifty naval mines.

The ship was protected by a curved armored deck that was up to 80 mm (3.1 in) thick; it sloped down at the sides to provide a measure of protection against enemy fire. The conning tower had 100 mm (3.9 in) thick sides, and the guns were protected by 50 mm (2 in) thick gun shields.

== Service history ==
=== Peacetime career ===
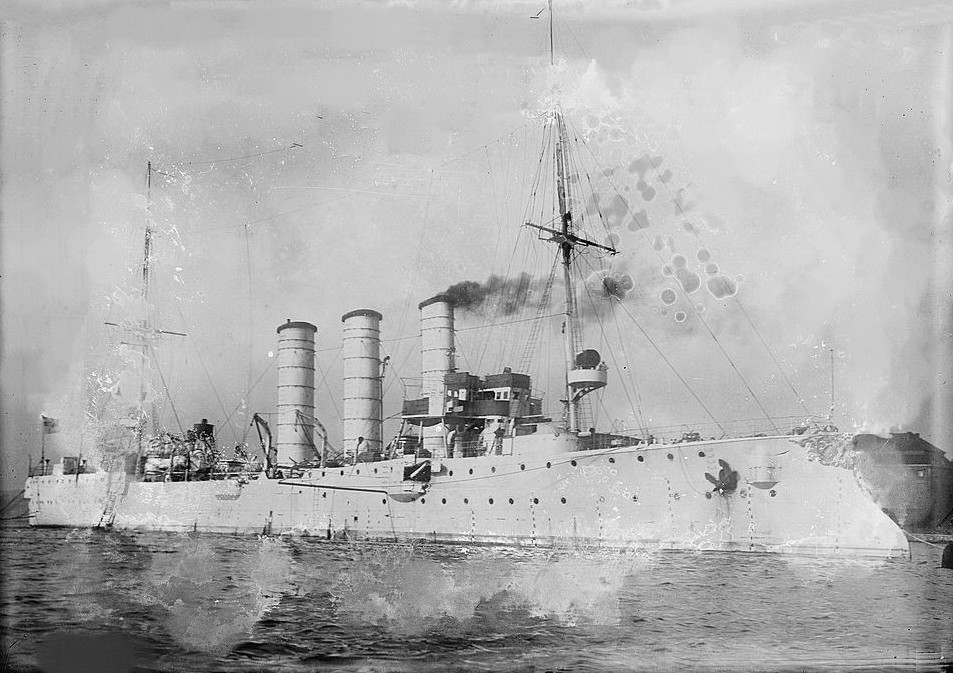
A prewar photograph of München

München was ordered under the contract name "M", (Note: German warships were ordered under provisional names. Additions to the fleet were given a single letter; ships intended to replace older or lost vessels were ordered as "Ersatz (name of the ship to be replaced)".) and was laid down at the AG Weser shipyard in Bremen on 18 August 1903. She was launched on 30 April 1904, during which Wilhelm Georg von Borscht, the mayor of Munich, christened the ship in the presence of Prince Ludwig III of Bavaria. Fitting-out work proceeded quickly, and the ship completed builder's sea trials in early November. The ship thereafter moved to the Kaiserliche Werft (Imperial Shipyard) in Wilhelmshaven, where she had her armament installed. She thereafter underwent acceptance trials with the navy. She was commissioned into the High Seas Fleet on 10 January 1905. After her commissioning, München conducted test voyages in the Baltic Sea, which concluded on 30 March. Despite the preferences of the fleet command, she was then employed as a torpedo test ship, replacing the cruiser Nymphe in that role, and to conduct experiments with wireless telegraphy.

The ship carried out individual training exercises in April and May as the crew familiarized themselves with the vessel; in May, she came under the command of Korvettenkapitän (KK—Corvette Captain) Friedrich Schultz. She then joined the fleet's other training ships in the Training and Experimental Ships Unit for further exercises. These were carried out in the western Baltic around Swinemünde. Beginning in August, München took part in shooting experiments to evaluate the lessons of the Russo-Japanese War. In 1906, the ship conducted a similar pattern of individual and unit exercises with the other training vessels. In March, KK Ferdinand Thyen took command of the ship. München sailed for Norwegian waters on 27 July, visiting Bergen and Trondheim; while there, she sent wireless signals to the Norddeich radio station to test the recently built station. She also sent signals to stations on Helgoland and at Cuxhaven. KK Johannes von Karpf relieved Thyen in October. In November, she took part in training exercises with the protected cruiser Vineta and I Training Flotilla in the eastern Baltic. On 9 December, München entered the dry dock at the Kaiserliche Werft for periodic maintenance that lasted until 25 January 1907.

The 1907 training schedule followed the same pattern as previous years, including exercises with the training unit in May. Kaiser Wilhelm II visited the ship in June to observe the U-boat, U-1's simulated attack against München, the first time a German submarine had been used in training. The cruiser participated in the annual fleet maneuvers held in August and September, during which she served as a flotilla leader for several torpedo boats. In October, KK Ferdinand Bertram took command of the vessel. She returned to the Kaiserliche Werft for another overhaul that lasted from 16 December to 8 February 1908. During the 1908 training year, München made a visit to Trondheim, Bergen, and Stavanger, Norway, from 25 May to 4 June to make another series of wireless experiments. The annual fleet maneuvers followed from 18 August to 6 September, during which the ship served with III Scouting Group, the scouting unit of the Reserve Fleet. Karpf returned to command the ship in September, after the end of the exercises. She left Kiel, Germany, on 24 October to make longer-ranged tests from Vigo and Málaga, Spain, and Funchal on the island of Madeira in the Atlantic. München arrived back in Kiel on 17 December.

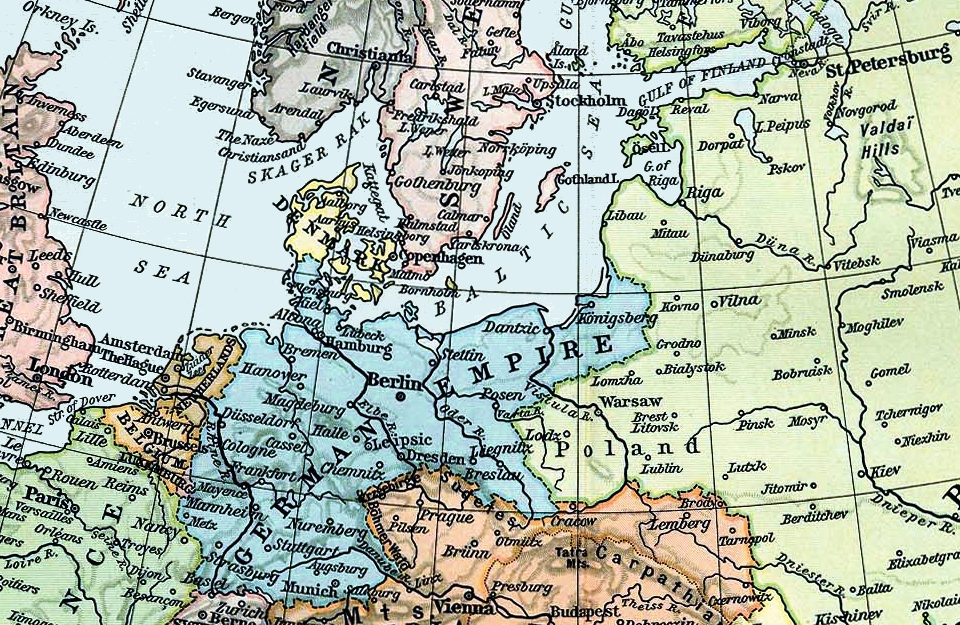
Map of the North and Baltic Seas in 1911

The year 1909 passed uneventfully, and on 11 December, she was again dry-docked for an overhaul that lasted through February 1910. Upon returning to service in March, the ship came under KK Ernst-Oldwig von Natzmer's command. During training exercises on 13 April, she accidentally collided with the torpedo boat S122. The latter had attempted to pass in front of München while trying to reach an attack position on the fleet battleships. München's bow struck the torpedo boat's engine room, causing significant damage and killing two men. Two other torpedo boats took S122 under tow to Sassnitz for repairs. München's bow was not seriously damaged in the accident. She had her crew reduced in November for repairs at the Kaiserliche Werft in Danzig, after which she was assigned as the torpedo target ship of the Training and Experimental Ships Unit. In December, KK Rudolf Bartels took command of the ship. The ship participated in torpedo training in Norwegian waters in July 1911, and she was present for a naval review held for Wilhelm II on 5 September. As München returned to Kiel from a training cruise on the night of 26 October, her crew lowered a boat with fourteen men in it to moor the cruiser to a buoy. As they were lowering the boat, the front rope loosened, dropping the boat downward. Six of the men drowned before they could be rescued. The ship underwent her annual overhaul from 10 December to late January 1912.

München passed the year 1912 in much the same routine as previous years. She was assigned to III Scouting Group for the annual fleet maneuvers in September, and from 21 October to 3 November, she went on a cruise to Vigo for another series of wireless tests. The same training routine repeated in 1913, and during the fleet maneuvers, Wilhelm II, Großadmiral (Grand Admiral) Alfred von Tirpitz, Admiral Friedrich von Ingenohl, and Admiral Georg Alexander von Müller came aboard the ship; Tirpitz, Ingenohl, and Müller were the State Secretary of the Imperial Naval Office, the fleet commander, and the Chief of the Imperial Naval Cabinet, respectively. During further exercises in the Great Belt on 19 December, München lightly collided with the torpedo boat V159, causing only minor damage to each vessel. The ship was again dry-docked in Danzig from 28 December to 7 February 1914 for periodic maintenance. The first half of 1914 proceeded as in years past, München occupying her time with torpedo training and maneuvers with other elements of the fleet.

=== World War I ===
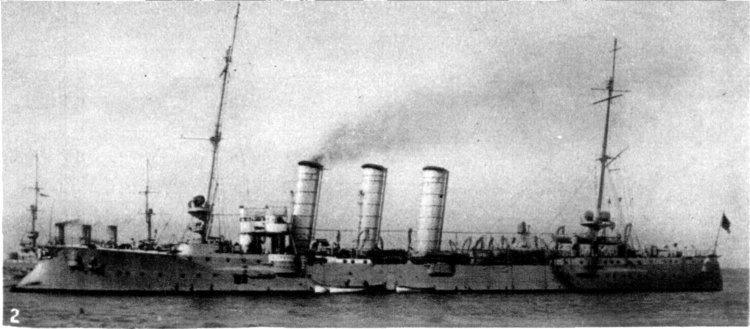
An unidentified member of the Bremen class

After the outbreak of World War I at the end of July 1914, München was assigned to III Scouting Group, which was attached to the High Seas Fleet, Germany's primary naval unit, based in the North Sea. She was transferred to IV Scouting Group on 25 August, and the following day, she and her sister ship Danzig were transferred to the Baltic Sea in response to the loss of the light cruiser Magdeburg. This proved to be short lived, and already on the 28th, she had been returned to the North Sea. That morning, she and Danzig lay moored at Brunsbüttel at the western end of the Kaiser Wilhelm Canal, when the British Harwich Force attacked the German patrol line in the Helgoland Bight. During the ensuing Battle of Helgoland Bight, München and Danzig were recalled and ordered to steam to the mouth of the Elbe and wait for further orders. At 12:25, the two cruisers were ordered to move into the Bight and support the cruiser Strassburg, but at 14:06, München was instead ordered to conduct reconnaissance out to the north-east of Helgoland.

München, still part of IV Scouting Group, took part in the fleet advance on 3–4 November 1914 in support of the raid on Yarmouth by the battlecruisers of I Scouting Group. The Germans hoped to surprise detached elements of the numerically superior British Grand Fleet or lure them to be ambushed by the High Seas Fleet. She was also present as part of the screen of the High Seas Fleet during the operation on 15–16 December to cover the battlecruisers' raid on Scarborough, Hartlepool and Whitby, by which time she had become the flagship of the II. Führer der Torpedoboote (2nd Commander of Torpedo Boats), Kapitän zur See (KzS—Captain at Sea) Karl von Restorff. She saw no combat during the action; after reports that other cruisers in the fleet screen had encountered British warships on the morning of 16 December, Ingenohl broke off and withdrew to port. München next took part in the fleet advance on 24 January 1915 to support I Scouting Group after it had been ambushed by the British 1st and 2nd Battlecruiser Squadrons during the Battle of Dogger Bank, though she again saw no action, as the battle had ended before the High Seas Fleet arrived late in the afternoon. Two further fleet advances followed on 29–30 March and 18–22 April, both of which ended without result.

On 7 May 1915, IV Scouting Group, which by then consisted of München, Danzig, Stettin, and Stuttgart, and twenty-one torpedo boats was sent into the Baltic to support a major operation against Russian positions at Libau. The operation was commanded by Konteradmiral (Rear Admiral) Albert Hopman, the commander of the reconnaissance forces in the Baltic. IV Scouting Group was tasked with screening to the north to prevent any Russian naval forces from moving out of the Gulf of Finland undetected, while several armored cruisers and other warships bombarded the port. The Russians did attempt to intervene with a force of four cruisers: Admiral Makarov, Bayan, Oleg, and Bogatyr. The Russian ships briefly engaged München, but both sides were unsure of the others' strength, and so both disengaged. Shortly after the bombardment, Libau was captured by the advancing German army, and München and the rest of IV Scouting Group were recalled to the High Seas Fleet.

After returning to the North Sea, the ships of IV Scouting Group took part in a series of fleet advances, all of which failed to locate British vessels. These took place on 17 and 29–30 May and 11–12 September. München was dry-docked from 24 September to 31 October for periodic maintenance. She was temporarily transferred back to the Baltic on 18 January 1916. While en route from Kiel to Libau, she collided with the freighter Moskau off Rixhöft. München's port side was badly damaged in the accident, and had to be dry-docked at the Kaiserliche Werft in Danzig for repairs that lasted until 6 March. She was thereafter ordered to return to the North Sea, arriving there four days later. The ship joined the fleet for an uneventful sortie on 25 March to the Amrum Bank. Another major operation against the British coast began on 24 April; the main fleet again covered I Scouting Group raided Yarmouth and Lowestoft. München and the rest of the fleet arrived back in Wilhelmshaven the next day.

==== Battle of Jutland ====
Maps showing the maneuvers of the British (blue) and German (red) fleets on 31 May – 1 June 1916

München next took part in the fleet operation that resulted in the Battle of Jutland on 31 May – 1 June 1916. IV Scouting Group, by then under the command of Kommodore (Commodore) Ludwig von Reuter, departed Wilhelmshaven at 03:30 on 31 May, along with the rest of the fleet. Tasked with screening for the fleet, München and the torpedo boat S54 were positioned on the starboard side of the fleet, abreast of the III Battle Squadron. As the High Seas Fleet approached the battle, which had begun between the opposing sides' battlecruiser forces, the cruisers of IV Scouting Group took up a position at the rear of the German line of battle by around 17:30 on 31 May. As a result, the ships weren't heavily engaged in the early portion of the action.

Later in the battle, shortly after 21:00, München and the rest of IV Scouting Group encountered the British 3rd Light Cruiser Squadron (3rd LCS). Reuter's ships were leading the High Seas Fleet south, away from the Grand Fleet. Due to the long range and poor visibility, only München and Stettin were able to engage the British cruisers; München fired 63 shells before she had to cease fire, without scoring any hits. She was hit twice in return, however; the first hit caused minimal damage, but the second struck her third funnel. The resulting explosion damaged four of her boilers, making it difficult for her to keep steam up in all of her boilers. Reuter turned his ships hard to starboard, in order to draw the British closer to the capital ships of the German fleet, but the 3rd LCS refused to take the bait and disengaged.

During the ferocious night fighting that occurred as the High Seas Fleet forced its way through the British rear, IV Scouting Group encountered the 2nd Light Cruiser Squadron at close range in the darkness. As the two squadrons closed on each other, the Germans illuminated HMS Southampton and HMS Dublin and concentrated their fire on the two ships. The two ships were badly damaged and set on fire and forced to retreat, while the Germans also fell back in an attempt to bring the British closer to the battlecruisers Moltke and Seydlitz. In the melee, the cruiser Frauenlob was hit and sunk by a torpedo launched by Southampton, and München nearly collided with the sinking Frauenlob. She managed to evade the wreck, and she then fired a torpedo at Southampton, but it missed. München was hit another three times during this engagement; two of the hits exploded in the water, causing minor splinter damage. The third shell went through the second funnel and exploded on a funnel support on the other side; one of the shell splinters knocked out the starboard rangefinder. The erratic maneuvering bent a wheel shaft in the helm, forcing her crew to steer the ship from the steering gear compartment for about two and a half hours.

At 01:20, München and Stettin briefly fired on the German torpedo boats G11, V1, and V3 before they discovered their identity. Early on the morning of 1 June, around 05:06, the pre-dreadnought battleships of the II Battle Squadron opened fire on what they thought were British submarines; the firing was so hysterical that it threatened to damage München and Stettin, as they were steaming up the side of the German line. The fleet commander, Vizeadmiral (Vice Admiral) Reinhard Scheer, was forced to give a general "cease-fire" order. München in turn spotted an imaginary submarine off Heligoland at 11:40 and opened fire on the empty sea. In the course of the battle, München was hit by a total of five medium-caliber shells, which, according to the historian V. E. Tarrant, killed eight men and wounded another twenty. The historians Hans Hildebrand, Albert Röhr, and Hans-Otto Steinmetz indicate only four were killed in addition to twenty wounded. The ship had fired 161 rounds from her guns.

==== Later operations ====
München underwent repairs at Vegesack and the Wilhelmshaven from 7 to 30 July. She was present for an inconclusive fleet advance on 18–19 August, where Scheer attempted once again to lure out part of the British fleet with a sweep toward the Dogger Bank. He broke off the operation after zeppelins reported the entire Grand Fleet at sea and returned to port. On 18–19 October, Scheer attempted a repeat of the original Jutland plan, which had called for a bombardment of Sunderland. It was to be München's final wartime operation. While en route at 09:40 on 19 October, München was hit by a torpedo launched by the submarine HMS E38 off the Dogger Bank. Scheer became convinced the British knew his location, and so he cancelled the operation and returned to port. München took on some 500 metric tons (490 long tons; 550 short tons) of water, and saltwater got into her boilers, contaminating the freshwater used to produce steam. She had to be taken under tow, first by the torpedo boat V73, and then by her sister Berlin. By the following day, her engines were back in operation, and she steamed into the Jade Bight under her own power, where she entered the Kaiserliche Werft in Wilhelmshaven.

After returning to port, München was examined, and it was determined that she could not be easily repaired, so the naval command decided to decommission her in November. She was disarmed and later employed as a barracks ship for patrol ships in 1918. After the war, she was stricken from the naval register on 5 November 1919 and ceded to the British as the war prize Q on 6 July 1920 under the terms of the Treaty of Versailles. She was subsequently sunk as a torpedo target in the Firth of Forth (at position 56° 07’ 00” N, 02° 45’ 50” W) on 28 October 1921.
