= Hugo Kraft =

German vice admiral

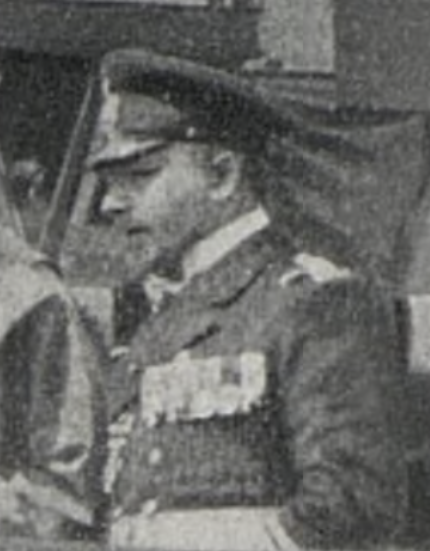
Kraft in 1915

Hugo Kraft (10 February 1866, in Hamburg – 15 November 1925) was a Vice admiral of the Kaiserliche Marine.

== Biography ==
Hugo Kraft joined the Imperial Navy on April 16, 1883. On April 17, 1886, he was promoted to Leutnant zur See, on March 25, 1890 to Oberleutnant zur See, on August 19, 1896 to Kapitänleutnant, and on October 8, 1902 to Korvettenkapitän. In 1888, he was a company officer in the II Shipyard Division (Wilhelmshaven).

From September 1905 to 30 September 1907, he was commander of the cruiser SMS Berlin. In this position, he was promoted to Fregattenkapitän on April 27, 1907. He then served as department chief in the Admiral's Staff of the Navy until May 1910. He was then in command of the armored cruiser SMS Scharnhorst) until November 1911. From January 1911 to March 1911, he was additionally assigned to conduct the business of the chief of the cruiser squadron. As a Kapitän zur See (promoted on 13 October 1908), he was in command of the battleship SMS Westfalen from 17 April 1912 to 3 October 1913. He was promoted to the rank of Captain.

On 14 July 1914, he was promoted to Konteradmiral. From March 1914 until April 1916, Kraft was Chief Shipyard Director of the Wilhelmshaven shipyard. Subsequently, he was promoted to Vice Admiral on 25 November 1916 and he was Director of the Shipyard Department in the Reichsmarineamt until December 1917. In January/February 1918 and again in June/July 1918, he was deputy chief of IV Squadron. In the meantime, he was deputy chief of III Squadron in April/May 1918. From August 1918 to November 1918 he then took over III Squadron as chief. During the Kiel Sailor's Uprising in November 1918, he was commander of III Squadron, which was considered the main source of unrest. Kraft had several sailors and stokers arrested, contributing to the escalation of the unrest.

He was discharged on 8 January 1919.

== Bibliography ==
- Hildebrand, Hans-H.; Röhr, Albert; Steinmetz, Hans-Otto. Die deutschen Kriegsschiffe–Biographien: ein Spiegel der Marinegeschichte von 1815 bis zur Gegenwart. Hamburg: Koehlers Verlagsgesellschaft.
- Stoelzel, Albert (1930). The ships of the German Navy and their whereabouts, 1939-1945. Berlin: Thormann & Goetsch. p. 119.
