= SMS Thetis =

Light cruiser of the German Imperial Navy

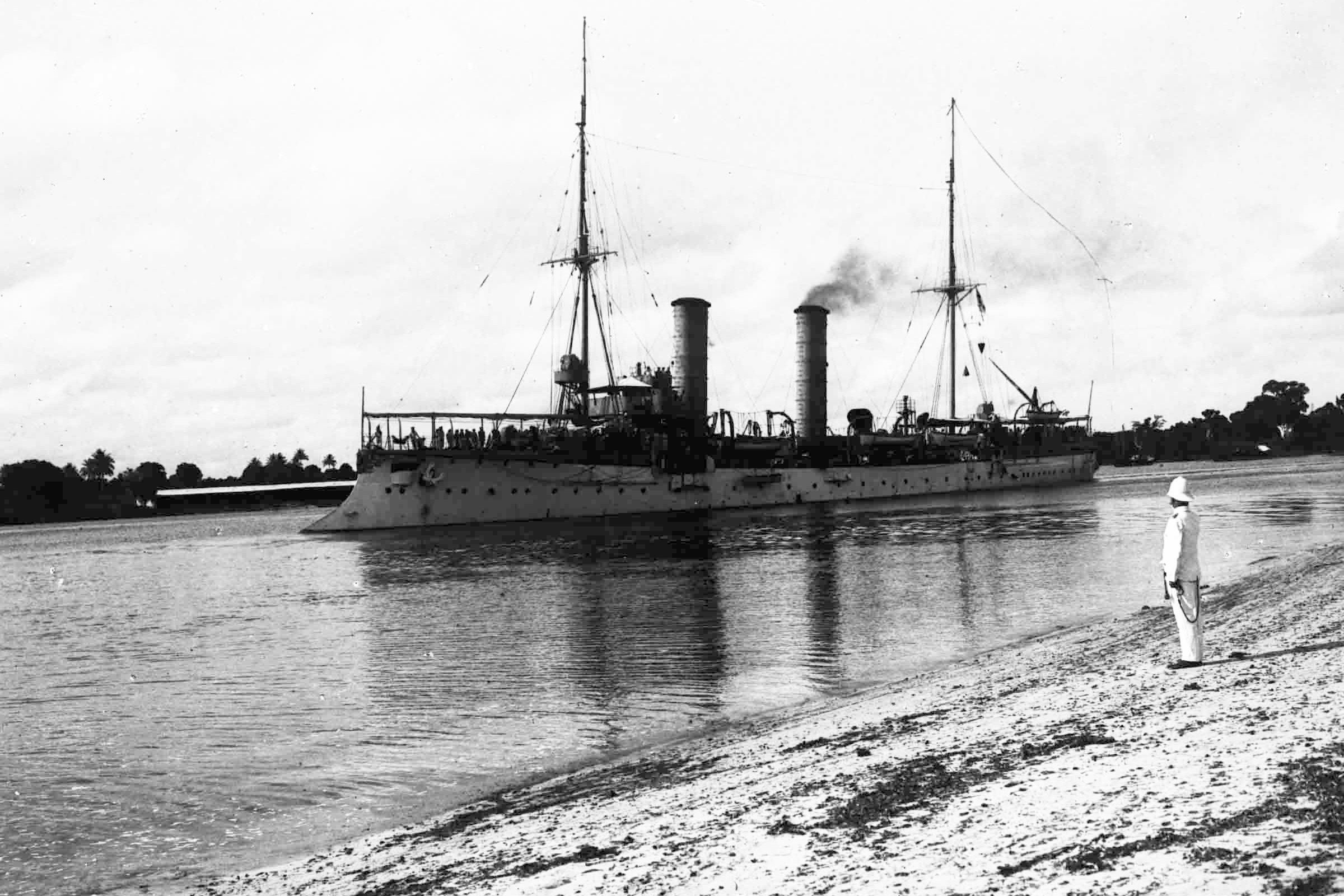
- SMS Thetis at Dar es Salaam, German East Africa

History

German Empire
- Name: Thetis
- Namesake: Thetis
- Laid down: September 1899
- Launched: 3 July 1900
- Commissioned: 14 September 1901
- Decommissioned: 30 November 1924
- Stricken: 27 March 1929
- Fate: Scrapped, 1930

General characteristics
- Class & type: Gazelle-class cruiser
- Displacement: Normal: 2,659 t (2,617 long tons); Full load: 3,005 t (2,958 long tons)
- Length: 105.1 m (344.8 ft) loa
- Beam: 12.2 m (40 ft)
- Draft: 4.92 m (16.1 ft)
- Installed power: 10 × water-tube boilers; 8,000 PS (7,900 ihp)
- Propulsion: 2 × triple-expansion steam engines; 2 × screw propellers
- Speed: 21.5 knots (39.8 km/h; 24.7 mph)
- Range: 3,560 nmi (6,590 km; 4,100 mi) at 10 knots (19 km/h; 12 mph)
- Complement: 14 officers; 243 enlisted men
- Armament: 10 × 10.5 cm (4.1 in) SK L/40 guns; 2 × 45 cm (17.7 in) torpedo tubes
- Armor: Deck: 20 to 25 mm (0.79 to 0.98 in); Conning tower 80 mm (3.1 in); Gun shields: 50 mm (2 in)

SMS Thetis was the fourth member of the ten-ship Gazelle class of light cruisers that were built for the German Kaiserliche Marine (Imperial Navy) in the late 1890s and early 1900s. The Gazelle class was the culmination of earlier unprotected cruiser and aviso designs, combining the best aspects of both types in what became the progenitor of all future light cruisers of the Imperial fleet. Built to be able to serve with the main German fleet and as a colonial cruiser, she was armed with a battery of ten 10.5 cm (4.1 in) guns and a top speed of 21.5 knots (39.8 km/h; 24.7 mph).

In late 1901, she was assigned to the East Asia Squadron; she operated in East Asian waters for the next four years, during which time she evacuated German nationals from Chemulpo in the Korean Empire during the Russo-Japanese War in 1904. Thetis was ordered to reinforce German forces in German East Africa after the outbreak of the Maji Maji Rebellion in mid-1905. The revolt was quickly suppressed and Thetis was thereafter recalled to Germany for an overhaul, after which she was placed in reserve.

Thetis was recommissioned after the start of World War I, initially to patrol the Danish Straits. She was soon transferred to the Detached Division for offensive operations against Russian forces, taking part in several patrols in the northern Baltic. During one of these operations in November 1914, she failed to report sighting Russian destroyers laying a minefield that sank a German armored cruiser two days later, leading to her commander being relieved of command. In 1915, she supported German Army operations in the area around the Gulf of Riga, ultimately being damaged by naval mines in the Battle of the Gulf of Riga in August. She was decommissioned for repairs and then served as a training ship for the rest of the war.

As one of the six cruisers permitted for the post-war Reichsmarine (Navy of the Realm), Thetis returned to active service between 1922 and 1924. This period passed uneventfully, though she served as the flagship of light forces in the Baltic and she made several visits to foreign ports in the region. Decommissioned in late 1924, she was used as a barracks ship until 1929, when she was struck from the naval register and broken up in 1930.

== Design ==
Following the construction of the unprotected cruisers of the Bussard class and the aviso Hela for the German Kaiserliche Marine (Imperial Navy), the Construction Department of the Reichsmarineamt (Imperial Navy Office) prepared a design for a new small cruiser that combined the best attributes of both types of vessels. The designers had to design a small cruiser with armor protection that had an optimal combination of speed, armament, and stability necessary for fleet operations, along with the endurance to operate on foreign stations in the German colonial empire. The resulting Gazelle design provided the basis for all of the light cruisers built by the German fleet to the last official designs prepared in 1914.

Plan, profile, and cross-section of the Gazelle class

Thetis was 105.1 meters (344 ft 10 in) long overall and had a beam of 12.2 m (40 ft) and a draft of 4.92 metres (16 ft 2 in) forward. She displaced 2,659 t (2,617 long tons) normally and up to 3,005 t (2,958 long tons) at full combat load. The ship had a minimal superstructure, which consisted of a small conning tower and bridge structure. Her hull had a raised forecastle and quarterdeck, along with a pronounced ram bow. She was fitted with two pole masts. She had a crew of 14 officers and 243 enlisted men.

Her propulsion system consisted of two triple-expansion steam engines manufactured by Germaniawerft, driving a pair of screw propellers. The engines were powered by ten coal-fired Marine-type water-tube boilers that were vented through a pair of funnels. They were designed to give 8,000 metric horsepower (7,900 ihp), for a top speed of 21.5 knots (39.8 km/h; 24.7 mph). Thetis carried 560 t (550 long tons) of coal, which gave her a range of 3,560 nautical miles (6,590 km; 4,100 mi) at 10 knots (19 km/h; 12 mph).

The ship was armed with ten 10.5 cm (4.1 in) SK L/40 guns in single pivot mounts. Two were placed side by side forward on the forecastle; six were located on the broadside in sponsons; and two were placed side by side aft. The guns could engage targets out to 12,200 m (13,300 yd). They were supplied with 1,000 rounds of ammunition, for 100 shells per gun. She was also equipped with two 45 cm (17.7 in) torpedo tubes with five torpedoes. They were submerged in the hull on the broadside.

The ship was protected by an armored deck that was 20 to 25 mm (0.79 to 0.98 in) thick. The deck sloped downward at the sides of the ship to provide a measure of protection against incoming fire. The conning tower had 80 mm (3.1 in) thick sides, and the guns were protected by 50 mm (2 in) thick gun shields.

== Service history ==
=== Early career ===
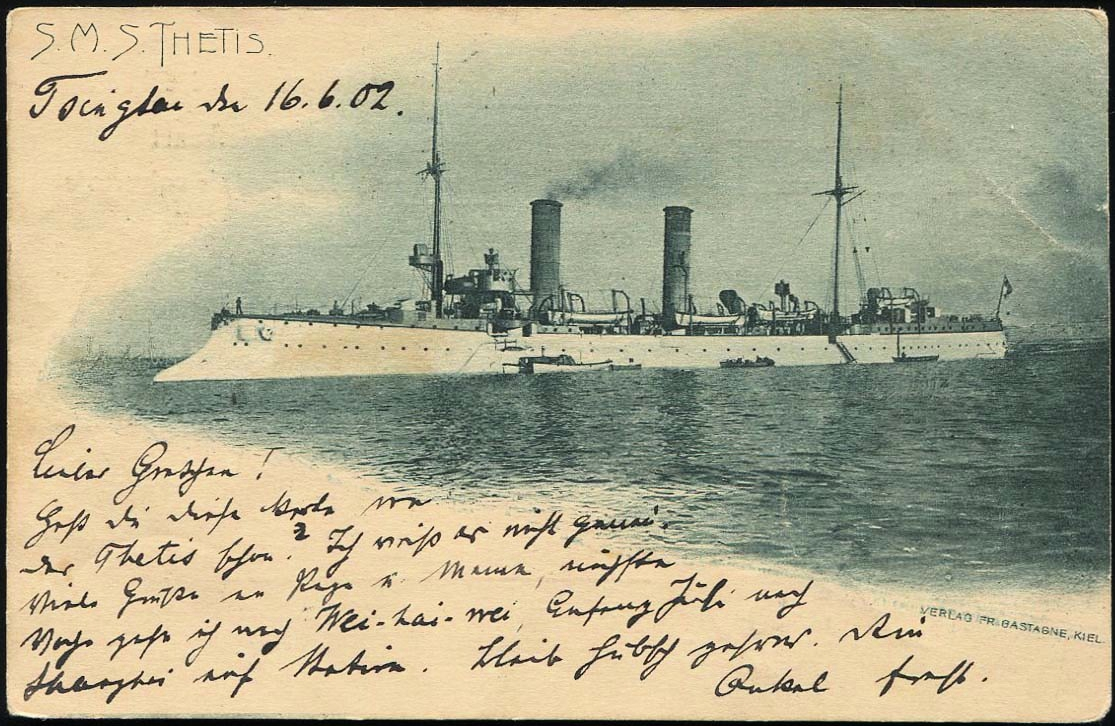
Postcard depicting Thetis, c. 1902

Thetis was ordered under the contract name "C", (Note: German warships were ordered under provisional names. Additions to the fleet were given a single letter; ships intended to replace older or lost vessels were ordered as "Ersatz (name of the ship to be replaced)".) and was laid down at the Kaiserliche Werft (Imperial Dockyard) in Danzig in September 1899 and was launched on 3 July 1900. At her launching ceremony the shipyard director, Konteradmiral (KAdm—Rear Admiral) Curt von Prittwitz und Gaffron, gave a speech and she was christened by Countess Amélie von Dohna-Schlobitten. After fitting-out work was completed, she was commissioned for sea trials on 14 September 1901. A month later, Korvettenkapitän (KK—Corvette Captain) Ernst van Semmern took command of the ship. On 1 December, she was assigned to join the East Asia Squadron. She passed through the Mediterranean Sea, transited the Suez Canal, and steamed into the Red Sea; Semmern had been secretly ordered by the Admiralstab (Admiralty Staff) to inspect the Farasan Islands to determine whether a coaling station could be built there. The nature of Semmern's report is not known, but Russian accusations that Germany sought to seize the islands led Germany to formally renounce the idea in 1902.

After leaving the Red Sea, Thetis stopped in Aden, the British Aden Settlement, Colombo in British Ceylon, and Calcutta, India; while in Calcutta, she met the Austro-Hungarian protected cruiser Zenta. The two ships' officers met with the Swedish explorer Sven Hedin. Thetis then continued on, reaching Singapore on 7 February 1902. While in the East Asia Squadron, Thetis was based in Qingdao. The commander of the squadron, Vizeadmiral (Vice Admiral) Richard Geissler, came aboard the ship for a cruise in the Yangtze river on 28 April. The ship visited Wusung, Nanking, and Hankou before returning to Qingdao on 15 May. That year, Thetis's gunners earned the Schiesspreis (Shooting Prize) for the East Asia Squadron, awarded every year by Kaiser Wilhelm II. In December, Fregattenkapitän (FK–Frigate Captain) Karl Dick replaced Semmern as the ship's captain. The year 1903 passed uneventfully. After the outbreak of the Russo-Japanese War in February 1904, Thetis was sent to Chemulpo in the Korean Empire to evacuate German nationals from the country. From October to December, she embarked on another cruise in the Yangtze.

In June 1905, FK Ludwig Glatzel became the ship's commander. Following the outbreak of the Maji Maji Rebellion against colonial rule in German East Africa in July, Thetis was detached from the East Africa Squadron to reinforce the colonial garrison, though she officially remained part of the unit. Thetis's crew again secured the Schiesspreis for the 1905 training year. She left Hong Kong on 28 August and arrived in East Africa on 26 September; the unprotected cruiser Seeadler joined her there on 1 October. Since Glatzel was the senior-most captain of the vessels in the area, which also included the unprotected cruiser Bussard, the station ship in East Africa, he became the commander of the naval forces in the region. The rebellion was quickly suppressed, however, and by 30 December Glatzel reembarked Thetis's landing party. He reported to the Admiralstab on 2 January 1906 that Thetis and Seeadler were no longer required and the naval command concurred, though Thetis remained in Dar es Salaam until 29 March, when she was ordered to return to Germany. After arriving in Danzig, Thetis was decommissioned on 18 June for a major overhaul, after which she was placed in reserve for the next eight years.

=== World War I ===
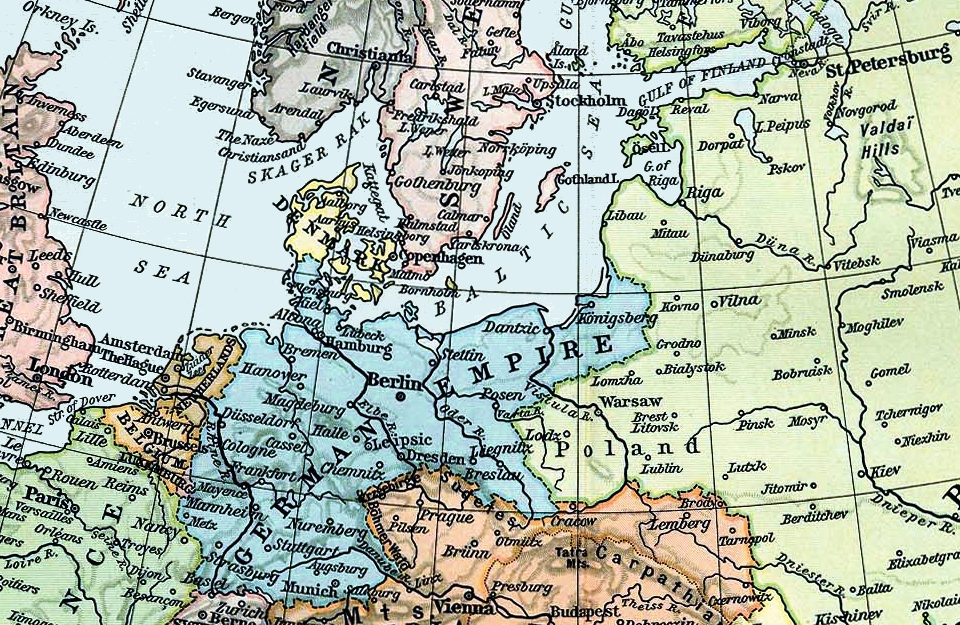
Map of the North and Baltic Seas in 1911

==== 1914 ====
Following the start of World War I in July 1914, Thetis was recommissioned on 4 August and assigned to the Coastal Defense Division of the Baltic Sea, commanded by KAdm Robert Mischke. Work to ready the ship for wartime service was completed by 24 August, and she was thereafter deployed to patrol the Danish Straits to guard against incursions by British warships. Thetis was transferred on 18 October to the Detached Division, commanded by KAdm Ehler Behring; the unit was tasked with offensive operations against Russian forces in the eastern Baltic. She took part in a sweep as far north as Gotska Sandön on 24–26 October before being sent with the 20th Torpedo-boat Half-flotilla to guard Memel against Russian attacks. She sent a landing party of seventy-four men to reinforce the defenses of Bajohren on 30–31 October.

Thetis was thereafter recalled to Danzig. While on the way back on the night of 6 November, Thetis's crew observed a pair of ships in the distance, but her commander, FK Paul Nippe, failed to report the sighting. At around midnight, the cruiser engaged in a brief action with a Russian destroyer. Behring was harshly critical of Nippe's failure to inform him of the events and Behring's superior, Prince Heinrich of Prussia, who was the Oberbefehlshaber der Ostsee (Supreme Commander of the Baltic Sea) relieved Nippe of command. KK Walter Hildebrand then took command of the ship on 22 November. As it turned out, the vessels Thetis had observed were four Russian destroyers that had laid a minefield off Memel that claimed Behler's flagship, the armored cruiser Friedrich Carl, on 17 November.

Behring led another sweep into the direction of Åland that lasted from 15 to 18 December; Thetis and the light cruiser Lübeck screened the eastward flank by patrolling off Utö, protecting the main German element from being surprised by Russian vessels that might sortie from the Gulf of Finland. While on the way back, Thetis encountered the German auxiliary Senator Strandes and did not recognize her in the darkness. She opened fire, prompting Senator Strandes to return fire, but Thetis quickly sank the auxiliary. On 26 December, she was temporarily transferred to V Battle Squadron to screen a sortie of the old pre-dreadnought battleships that advanced as far north as Gotland. The ships arrived back in port on 30 December and Thetis returned to the Detached Division.

==== 1915 ====
On 6 to 9 January 1915, Behring conducted another sweep to Utö, the harbor of which was being used by Russian submarines as an advance base. Since Thetis had the shallowest draft of any of the cruisers on the operation, she was selected to lead an attack on the port with several torpedo boats. Behring called off the attack, however, after determining the force was not strong enough to overpower the Russian defenses. Thetis was sent to the Kaiserliche Werft in Kiel for repairs from 20 January to 5 February. She then returned to the Detached Division, and Behring came aboard from 17 to 20 March for another sweep in company with the light cruiser Stralsund. The ships patrolled north of Memel, where Russian naval forces were known to operate. Thetis remained in Memel for the next month and supported a minelaying operation off the island of Dagö in the Gulf of Riga.

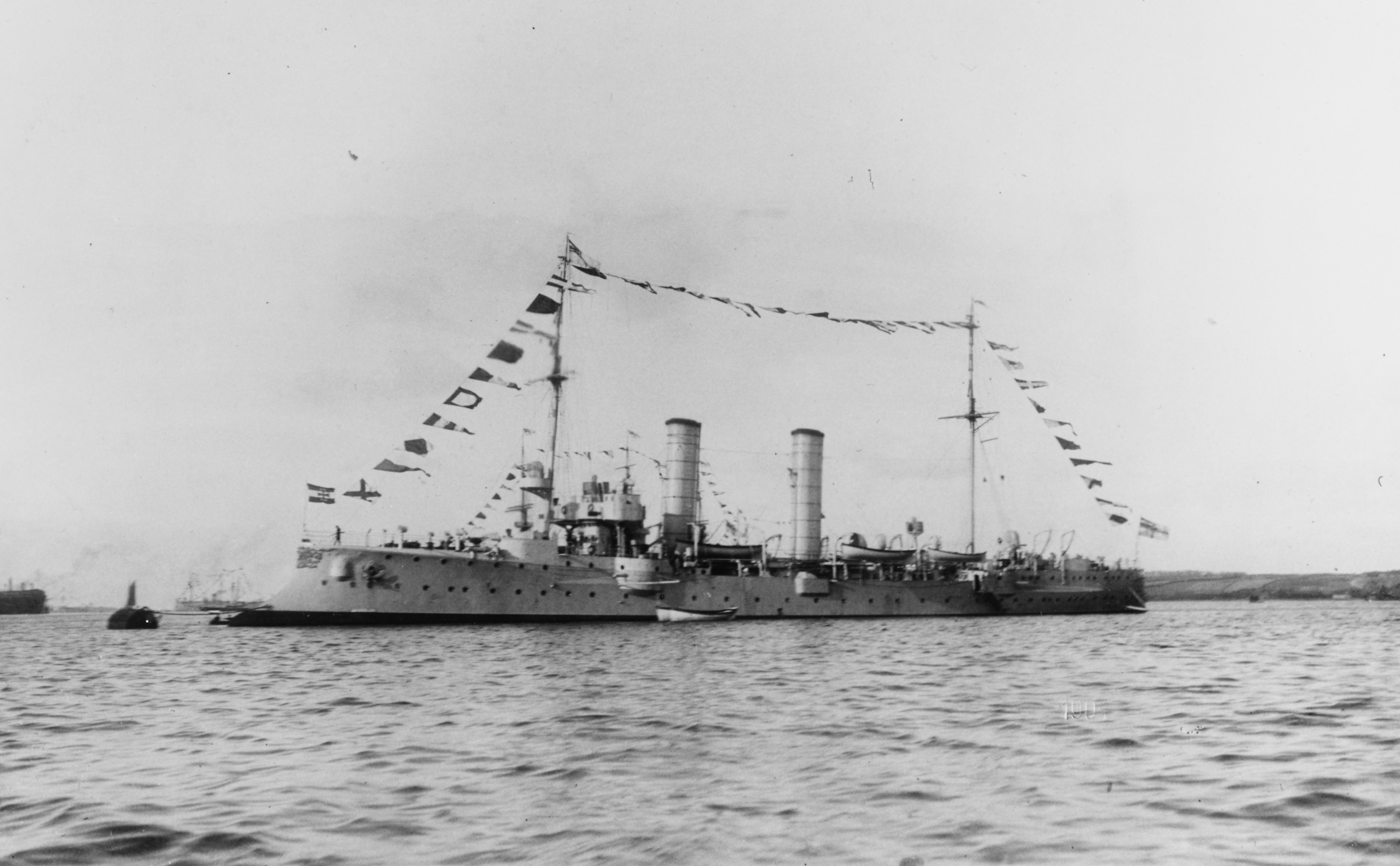
One of the Gazelle-class cruisers, possibly Thetis, in Kiel in 1901

On 20 April, the German naval command created a new command element in the Baltic: the Führer der Aufklärungsstreitkräfte in der östlichen Ostsee (Leader of Reconnaissance Fores in the Eastern Baltic), with KAdm Albert Hopman its first commander. Thetis was assigned to the unit. As the Central Powers prepared to launch the Gorlice–Tarnów Offensive in early May, the extreme left flank of the German Army was ordered to launch a diversionary attack on 27 April. Thetis was assigned to the naval support for the attack; on the first day of the attack, she and Lübeck shelled the port of Libau. Thetis then patrolled off the entrance to the Irben Strait that led into the Gulf of Riga. On 7 May, the Army was poised to seize Libau, and so requested naval support for the attack. Thetis and several other cruisers and torpedo boats covered the assault on the city and patrolled to ensure no Russian naval forces attempted to intervene. On 12 May, a Russian submarine attacked Thetis twice, but failed to score any hits.

On 14 May, Thetis had taken the U-boat U-4 under tow off Bogskär island in the Gulf of Finland. The Russian submarine Drakon attacked the two German vessels, launching three torpedoes at Thetis and a fourth at U-4, all of which missed. From the recently captured naval base at Libau, the Germans began to make offensive operations further into the Baltic. On 3 June, Thetis, four torpedo boats, and a seaplane tender attempted to force the Irben Strait, where they intended to lay a minefield. Russian and British submarines intercepted the flotilla in the Strait, however. The Russian submarine Okun attempted to move into position to attack Thetis, but one of the torpedo boats spotted her periscope and forced it off. On 5 June, the British submarine HMS E9 arrived on the scene, by which time the German vessels had withdrawn to the western coast of Gotland. There, Thetis and the torpedo boats were resupplying from the collier SS Dora Hugo Stinnes. E9 launched a spread of torpedoes at the ships; the one fired at Thetis missed, but the collier was hit, as was the torpedo boat S148. The collier sank, but the torpedo boat survived and made it back to port.

Another minelaying operation took place on 25–26 June; this time, Thetis escorted minelayers that laid a field in the Sea of Åland. Thetis again came under torpedo attack from an unknown submarine, though she was not hit. On 19 July, Thetis was based in Windau for a planned attack on the Gulf of Riga by elements of the High Seas Fleet. In August, Thetis was assigned to the fleet that was to break into the Gulf of Riga to support the German Army's attempt to capture the city. On 8 August, the Germans made their first attempt to force the Irben Strait, during which Thetis and the torpedo boat S144 were damaged by mines. Thetis had to be towed back to Libau by minesweepers. The attack failed due to heavy Russian resistance, and the operation had to be postponed. In the meantime, while Thetis was in Windau, she underwent temporary repairs that allowed her to steam for Neufahrwassar on 21 August, proceeding then to Kiel, where she was decommissioned on 3 September in the Kaiserliche Werft for repairs.

While out of service in 1917, Thetis was rearmed with nine newer 10.5 cm SK L/45 guns in U-boat mountings; in this configuration, Thetis was recommissioned on 19 October for use as a gunnery training ship. She served in this capacity for the next year of the war, which passed uneventfully for Thetis; no events of note were recorded. She was decommissioned again on 19 December 1918, following Germany's defeat the previous month.

=== Reichsmarine career ===
She was one of six light cruisers Germany was permitted to retain by the Treaty of Versailles that ended the war. Modernized in the early 1920s, she was recommissioned on 2 April 1922 and assigned to the Marinestation der Ostsee (Baltic Sea Naval Station). Her first commander during this period was FK Walther Kinzel. The year 1922 passed uneventfully, apart from routine training exercises with other elements of the small German fleet. In 1923, the ship made a pair of visits abroad; the first, to Mölle, Sweden, was from 11 to 15 July; the second, to Loen, Norway, lasted from 18 to 24 July. In October, Kapitän zur See (KzS—Captain at Sea) Ernst Bindseil replaced Kinzel. At the same time, the fleet was reorganized and Thetis became the flagship of light naval forces in the Baltic, which also included her sister ship Medusa and I Torpedo-boat Flotilla. The commander of the unit was KzS und Kommodore (and Commodore) Iwan Oldekop, who was promoted to konteradmiral on 1 November.

Thetis made another pair of foreign visits in July 1924, both to ports in Estonia, one of the countries that had been created from the dissolution of the Russian Empire after the war. The first was to Tallinn (formerly Reval) from 5 to 10 July, and the second to Pärnu from 12 to 14 July. On 30 November, the ship was decommissioned in Wilhelmshaven, with her sister Nymphe replacing her as flagship. The vessel was thereafter used as a barracks ship in Wilhelmshaven until early 1929; struck from the naval register on 27 March, she and the torpedo boats V1 and V6 were sold to Blohm & Voss. Thetis was broken up in Hamburg in 1930.
