= SMS Gazelle =

Light cruiser of the German Imperial Navy

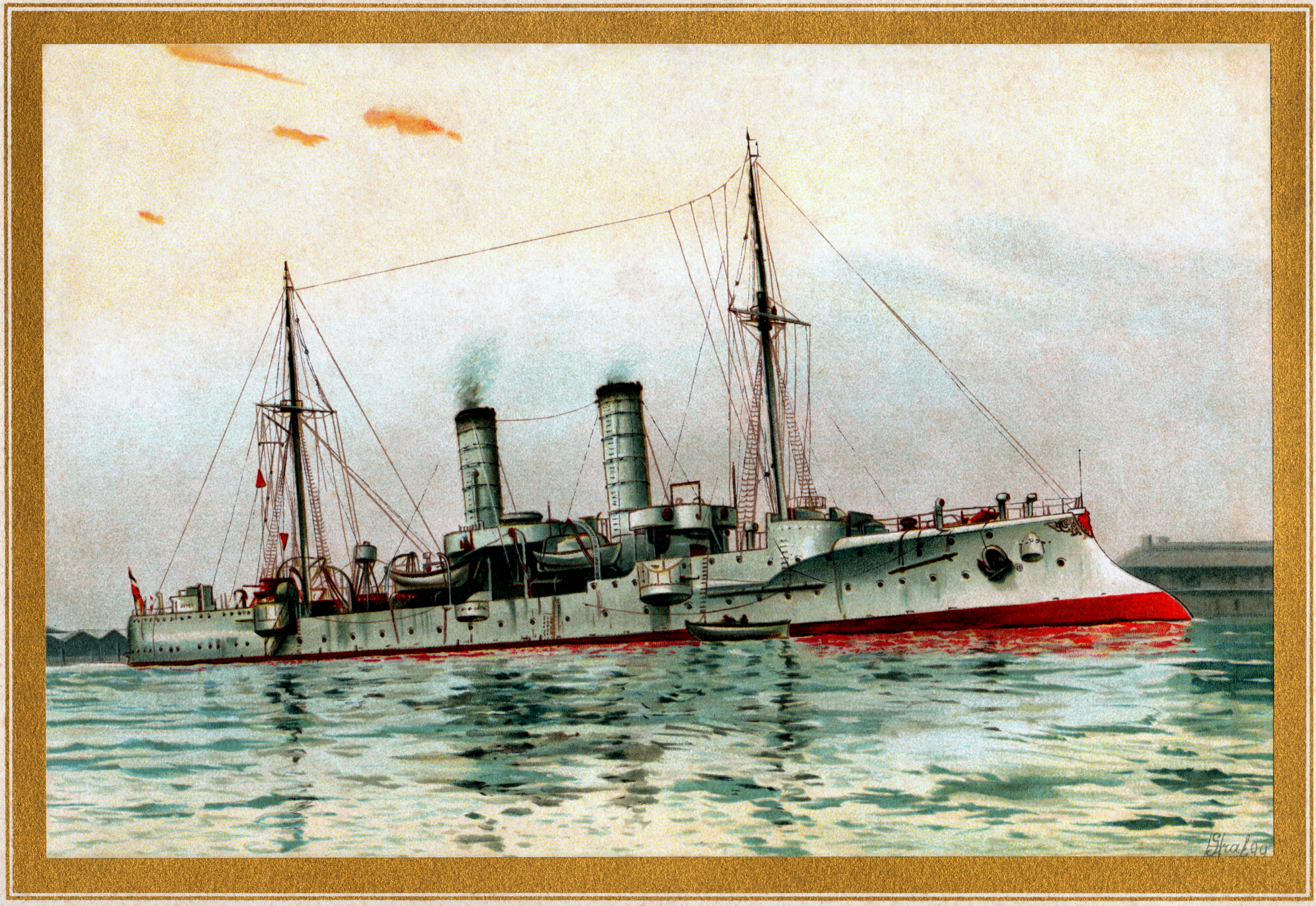
- A 1902 lithograph of Gazelle

History

German Empire
- Name: Gazelle
- Laid down: April 1897
- Launched: 31 March 1898
- Commissioned: 15 June 1901
- Decommissioned: 22 February 1915
- Out of service: Hulked, 1916
- Stricken: 28 August 1920
- Fate: Scrapped 1920

General characteristics
- Class & type: Gazelle-class cruiser
- Displacement: Normal: 2,643 t (2,601 long tons); Full load: 2,963 t (2,916 long tons)
- Length: 105 m (344 ft 6 in) loa
- Beam: 12.2 m (40 ft)
- Draft: 4.84 m (15 ft 11 in)
- Installed power: 8 × Niclausse boilers; 6,000 PS (5,900 ihp)
- Propulsion: 2 × triple-expansion steam engines; 2 × screw propellers
- Speed: 19.5 knots (36.1 km/h; 22.4 mph)
- Range: 3,570 nmi (6,610 km; 4,110 mi) at 10 kn (19 km/h; 12 mph)
- Complement: 14 officers; 243 enlisted men
- Armament: 10 × 10.5 cm (4.1 in) SK L/40 guns; 3 × 45 cm (17.7 in) torpedo tubes
- Armor: Deck: 20 to 25 mm (0.79 to 0.98 in); Conning tower 80 mm (3.1 in); Gun shields: 50 mm (2 in)

SMS Gazelle was the lead ship of the ten-vessel Gazelle class of light cruisers that were built for the German Kaiserliche Marine (Imperial Navy) in the late 1890s. The Gazelle class was the culmination of earlier unprotected cruiser and aviso designs, combining the best aspects of both types in what became the progenitor of all future light cruisers of the Imperial fleet. Built to be able to serve with the main German fleet and as a colonial cruiser, she was armed with a battery of ten 10.5 cm (4.1 in) guns and a top speed of 19.5 knots (36.1 km/h; 22.4 mph). Her Niclausse boilers proved to be troublesome in service, and these were later replaced in the mid-1900s.

Gazelle initially operated with the main fleet in home waters, during which time she made a major cruise to Spain to greet the German expeditionary force that had been sent to suppress the Boxer Uprising. In 1902, she was sent overseas; slated to join the East Asia Squadron, she instead was diverted to Venezuela in response to rising tensions that ultimately produced the Venezuelan crisis of 1902–1903. During the crisis, she operated with British and Italian warships in a blockade of the country and her crew seized the gunboat Restaurador, pressing her into German service. Following the settlement of the dispute, Gazelle cruised in North and Central American waters, visiting numerous ports in the region. She was recalled to Germany in 1904, decommissioned, and overhauled, thereafter remaining out of service for the next decade.

The ship was recommissioned after the start of World War I in 1914, serving in the Baltic Sea as part of the Coastal Defense Division, then the Detached Division, before returning to the former in late 1914. After being damaged by Russian naval mines in January 1915, she was deemed not worth repairing and was instead converted into a mine storage hulk, a role she filled for the rest of the war. She was ultimately struck from the naval register in 1920 and broken up.

== Design ==
Following the construction of the unprotected cruisers of the Bussard class and the aviso Hela for the German Kaiserliche Marine (Imperial Navy), the Construction Department of the Reichsmarineamt (Imperial Navy Office) prepared a design for a new small cruiser that combined the best attributes of both types of vessels. The designers had to design a small cruiser with armor protection that had an optimal combination of speed, armament, and stability necessary for fleet operations, along with the endurance to operate on foreign stations in the German colonial empire. The resulting Gazelle design provided the basis for all of the light cruisers built by the German fleet to the last official designs prepared in 1914.

Plan, profile, and cross-section of the Gazelle class

Gazelle was 105 meters (344 ft 6 in) long overall and had a beam of 12.2 m (40 ft) and a draft of 4.84 m (15 ft 11 in) forward. She displaced 2,643 t (2,601 long tons) normally and up to 2,963 t (2,916 long tons) at full combat load. The ship had a minimal superstructure, which consisted of a small conning tower and bridge structure. She was fitted with two pole masts. Her hull had a raised forecastle and quarterdeck, along with a pronounced ram bow. She had a crew of 14 officers and 243 enlisted men.

Her propulsion system consisted of two triple-expansion steam engines manufactured by Germaniawerft, driving a pair of screw propellers. The engines were powered by eight coal-fired Niclausse boilers that were vented through a pair of funnels. They were designed to give 6,000 metric horsepower (5,900 ihp), for a top speed of 19.5 knots (36.1 km/h; 22.4 mph). Gazelle carried 500 t (490 long tons) of coal, which gave her a range of 3,570 nautical miles (6,610 km; 4,110 mi) at 10 knots (19 km/h; 12 mph).

Gazelle's armament consisted of ten 10.5 cm (4.1 in) SK L/40 guns in single pivot mounts. Two were placed side-by-side forward on the forecastle; six were located on the broadside in sponsons; and two were placed side-by-side aft. The guns could engage targets out to 12,200 m (13,300 yd). They were supplied with 1,000 rounds of ammunition, for 100 shells per gun. She was also equipped with three 45 cm (17.7 in) torpedo tubes with eight torpedoes. One was submerged in the hull in the bow and two were mounted in deck launchers on the broadside.

The ship was protected by an armored deck that was 20 to 25 mm (0.79 to 0.98 in) thick. The deck sloped downward at the sides of the ship to provide a measure of protection against incoming fire. The conning tower had 80 mm (3.1 in) thick sides, and the guns were protected by 50 mm (2 in) thick gun shields.

== Service history ==
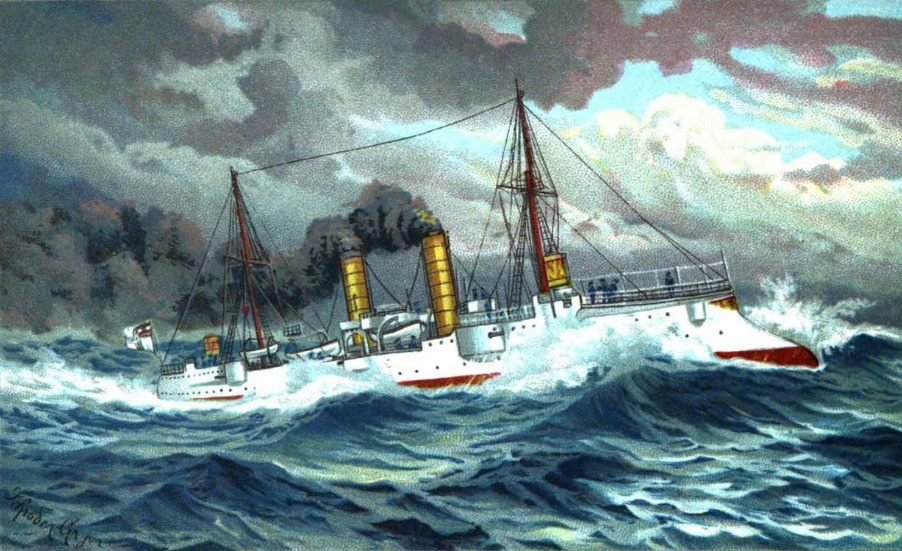
Illustration of Gazelle in heavy seas

Gazelle was ordered under the contract name "G", (Note: German warships were ordered under provisional names. Additions to the fleet were given a single letter; ships intended to replace older or lost vessels were ordered as "Ersatz (name of the ship to be replaced)".) and was laid down at the Germaniawerft shipyard in Kiel in April 1897. She was launched on 31 March 1898 in the presence of Victoria, the widow of the late Kaiser Friedrich III, and her daughter-in-law, Princess Irene. Konteradmiral (Rear Admiral) Alfred von Tirpitz christened the ship at her launching, after which fitting-out work commenced. She was commissioned for sea trials on 23 November, which revealed problems with her French-designed Niclausse boilers that necessitated decommissioning for modifications on 6 April 1899. She was recommissioned on 6 October 1900, but her boilers continued to prove troublesome and she was decommissioned again on 14 November. She was finally commissioned for active service on 15 June 1901, assigned to I Squadron.

The ships of I Squadron conducted unit exercises in the North Sea until 22 July, when they were sent to visit Spain and Portugal. While there, on 1 August, the ships rendezvoused with the four Brandenburg-class battleships and their escorts in Lisbon, Portugal, which were returning from their deployment to help suppress the Boxer Uprising in Qing China. While on the way back to Germany, Gazelle was detached to visit Portland, Britain on 9 August, returning to Kiel three days later. She participated in the annual fleet training maneuvers that lasted from 22 August to 15 September. During the exercises, she operated with II Scouting Group, part of the reconnaissance force for the main German fleet. During the maneuvers, the fleet held a naval review for Tsar Nicholas II of Russia, who was visiting Germany at the time.

=== East America station ===
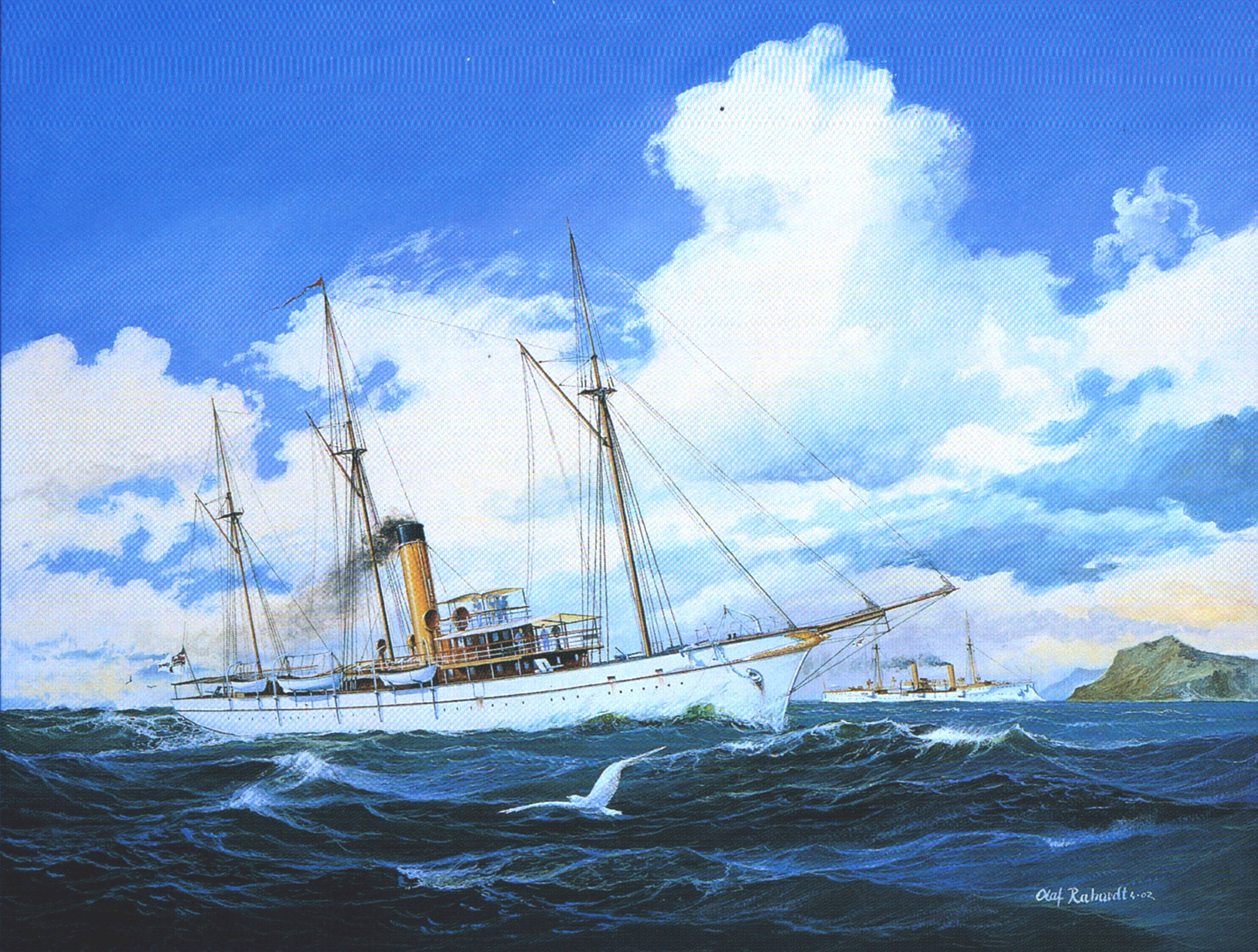
Illustration of Restaurador under German flag, with Gazelle in the background

Gazelle was ordered to join the East Asia Squadron in early October 1901, but the order was rescinded in favor of sending her sister Thetis instead. Gazelle remained in Germany until January 1902, when she was slated to join her sister in East Asian waters. She was redirected to the Caribbean Sea, as tensions rose with Venezuela. Gazelle officially remained assigned to the East Asia Squadron until late 1902, though joined the East American Cruiser Division on arrival in the Caribbean on 3 February. The unit was created to respond to the dispute with Venezuela, and at that time also included the protected cruiser Vineta and the unprotected cruiser Falke. Gazelle stopped in Port of Spain, where she met Falke, before proceeding to Venezuela, stopping in Charlotte Amalie from 24 May to 10 June. The two ships assisted in the evacuation of German and French nationals from La Guaira and Carúpano to protect them from expected fighting, carrying them to Saint Thomas in the Dutch Virgin Islands.

She then departed to visit the Antilles. During the Venezuelan crisis of 1902–1903, Germany and Great Britain, joined later by the Kingdom of Italy, issued demands for reparations following internal unrest in Venezuela; Venezuelan refusal led to the imposition of a blockade by the three powers. Gazelle and the Falke were the German contribution to the blockading squadron; they joined four British cruisers and three smaller vessels in enforcing the blockade. The Venezuelan gunboat Restaurador was seized during the blockade; she had been moored in Guanta when Gazelle arrived there on 11 December. The Germans ordered the Venezuelan gunboat to strike her flag and disembark the crew and ten minutes later they complied with the German demands. Gazelle sent a steam pinnace and two cutters to board the vessel. Restaurador was then pressed into German service, under the command of Kapitänleutnant (Captain Lieutenant) Titus Türk, along with a crew of three other officers, a machine operator, and fifty men from Gazelle. The gunboat, in poor condition owing to neglect from her former crew, required repairs before she could join the German vessels.

On 13 December, Restaurador departed for Trinidad, where she was drydocked to have her hull cleaned. She also had boiler repairs done that were completed on 10 January 1903. She then returned to Venezuelan waters, where she joined the three-power blockade squadron, initially off Puerto Cabello. On 14 January, she shifted to Tucacas and she suffered a machinery breakdown that day, though her crew was able to repair her engines while at sea. The ship returned to Puerto Cabello on 19 January. During this time, Gazelle operated on the blockade line, and on 4 January, she stopped a Venezuelan merchant ship and seized her, taking her to Trinidad. The blockade ended on 23 February with a negotiated settlement, and Türk handed Restaurador back to the Venezuelan Navy in a condition better than when the Germans had seized the vessel. Gazelle was detached from the division on 17 March, for repairs at Newport News in the United States that lasted from 31 March to 14 June.

Gazelle then joined Vineta for a cruise in North American waters that included a stop in Halifax, Nova Scotia; the ships then entered the Saint Lawrence River, steaming as far inland as Montreal, Canada. Gazelle arrived back in the Caribbean on 27 October, stopping in Saint Thomas. By the end of the year, Gazelle lay off Santo Domingo, the capital of the Dominican Republic; she had sent a landing party ashore to protect the German consulate owing to unrest in the country. She then moved to Port-au-Prince to send a detachment ashore there as well. Gazelle moved to Veracruz, Mexico in January 1904, where her commander made an official visit to the President of Mexico, Porfirio Díaz. The ship visited Belize in British Honduras and several islands in the area. She next returned to Newport News for maintenance, where she was visited by Theodore Roosevelt, the President of the United States. On 19 June, she was recalled to Germany, arriving back in Kiel on 18 July. She was decommissioned in Danzig on 3 August and taken into the Kaiserliche Werft (Imperial Shipyard) there for an overhaul. During the overhaul, her troublesome Niclausse boilers were replaced with navy-built models.

=== World War I and fate ===
Illustration of Gazelle

Gazelle remained laid up, out of service, for more than a decade until the outbreak of World War I in July 1914. She was reactivated on 18 August and assigned to the Coastal Defense Division of the Baltic Sea. Shortly thereafter, she was transferred to the Detached Division for offensive operations against Russian forces in the eastern Baltic. She joined IV Battle Squadron for a sweep into the Gulf of Finland that lasted from 24 to 29 August, during which she cruised on a patrol line between Gotland and Courland. The Germans failed to locate any Russian warships, and on the 29th, Gazelle was detached to bombard the lighthouse at Steinort to deny it as a navigational marker to Russian vessels. She participated in an operation in the Bothnian Sea that lasted from 4 to 9 September, though engine problems prevented her from taking part in the first stage. After completing repairs in Danzig, she steamed as far north as the Sea of Åland and then joined a demonstration off Windau.

She escorted transports during an operation in the eastern Baltic by IV Battle Squadron from 19 to 24 September. The ship thereafter returned to the Coastal Defense Division, temporarily serving as its flagship. During this period, she operated in the western Baltic, patrolling the Danish Straits to prevent British submarines from penetrating into the Baltic. While cruising in the area on 17 November, Gazelle was attacked by the British submarine HMS E9. The submarine fired a pair of torpedoes at the cruiser, but both missed. On the night of 25–26 January 1915, she struck Russian naval mines to the north of Cape Arkona. The mine explosion tore off both of her screws and she had to be towed to Swinemünde by the torpedo boats G132 and G134. On 22 February, the German Navy decided the old cruiser was not worth repairing, and so she was placed out of service, with her crew being used to man more modern vessels. She was converted into a hulk for minelayers, first at Danzig and then at Cuxhaven. In 1918, she was moved to Wilhelmshaven. After the end of the war, Gazelle was formally stricken from the naval register on 28 August 1920 and broken up for scrap in Wilhelmshaven.
