= SMS Medusa =

Light cruiser of the German Imperial Navy

- Medusa passing under the Levensau High Bridge in the Kiel Canal

History

Germany
- Name: Medusa
- Namesake: SMS Medusa
- Laid down: 22 January 1900
- Launched: 5 December 1900
- Commissioned: 26 July 1901
- Decommissioned: 26 September 1924
- Stricken: 27 March 1929
- Fate: Scuttled, 3 May 1945

General characteristics
- Class & type: Gazelle-class cruiser
- Displacement: Normal: 2,659 t (2,617 long tons); Full load: 2,972 t (2,925 long tons)
- Length: 105.1 m (344.8 ft) loa
- Beam: 12.2 m (40 ft)
- Draft: 4.84 m (15.9 ft)
- Installed power: 10 × water-tube boilers; 8,000 PS (7,900 ihp)
- Propulsion: 2 × triple-expansion steam engines; 2 × screw propellers
- Speed: 21.5 knots (39.8 km/h; 24.7 mph)
- Range: 3,560 nmi (6,590 km; 4,100 mi) at 10 kn (19 km/h; 12 mph)
- Complement: 14 officers; 243 enlisted men
- Armament: 10 × 10.5 cm (4.1 in) SK L/40 guns; 2 × 45 cm (17.7 in) torpedo tubes
- Armor: Deck: 20 to 25 mm (0.79 to 0.98 in); Conning tower 80 mm (3.1 in); Gun shields: 50 mm (2 in)

SMS Medusa was a member of the ten-ship Gazelle class of light cruisers that were built for the German Kaiserliche Marine (Imperial Navy) in the late 1890s and early 1900s. The Gazelle class was the culmination of earlier unprotected cruiser and aviso designs, combining the best aspects of both types in what became the progenitor of all future light cruisers of the Imperial fleet. Built to be able to serve with the main German fleet and as a colonial cruiser, she was armed with a battery of ten 10.5 cm (4.1 in) guns and a top speed of 21.5 knots (39.8 km/h; 24.7 mph). Medusa served in all three German navies—the Kaiserliche Marine, the Reichsmarine (Navy of the Realm) of Weimar Germany, and the Kriegsmarine (War Navy) of Nazi Germany—over the span of over forty years.

During her career in the Imperial fleet, she served in the reconnaissance unit for the High Seas Fleet from 1903 to 1907; during this period, she took part in cruises overseas and routine training exercises. She temporarily replaced her sister ship Nymphe as a gunnery training ship in 1908 while the latter was undergoing repairs. Medusa was herself overhauled and then placed in reserve until August 1914, when the outbreak of World War I led to her recommissioning. She initially operated in the mouth of the Elbe, supporting the flotilla tasked with defending the mouth of the river. She was transferred to the Baltic in late 1915 after her sister Undine was sunk, where she served as the flagship of the Coastal Defense Division. Decommissioned again at the end of 1916, she was used as an auxiliary ship for the rest of the war.

Medusa was among the six light cruisers Germany was permitted to retain under the terms of the Treaty of Versailles, and she was the first major warship to return to service in 1920; as a result, she served as the Reichsmarine's flagship until relieved by the battleship Hannover in 1921. Her career in the early 1920s followed a similar pattern to her prewar years, being occupied with training exercises and visits to foreign ports. She was decommissioned for the last time in 1924 and subsequently used as a barracks ship until 1940, when during World War II, she was converted into a floating anti-aircraft battery. Based outside Wilhelmshaven, she helped to defend the port for the rest of the war, before being badly damaged in an air raid in April 1945. Her crew scuttled her on 3 May, and she was later broken up in 1948–1950.

== Design ==
Following the construction of the unprotected cruisers of the Bussard class and the aviso Hela for the German Kaiserliche Marine (Imperial Navy), the Construction Department of the Reichsmarineamt (Imperial Navy Office) prepared a design for a new small cruiser that combined the best attributes of both types of vessels. The designers had to design a small cruiser with armor protection that had an optimal combination of speed, armament, and stability necessary for fleet operations, along with the endurance to operate on foreign stations in the German colonial empire. The resulting Gazelle design provided the basis for all of the light cruisers built by the German fleet to the last official designs prepared in 1914.

Plan, profile, and cross-section of the Gazelle class

Medusa was 104.8 meters (343 ft 10 in) long overall and had a beam of 12.2 m (40 ft) and a draft of 4.84 m (15 ft 11 in) forward. She displaced 2,659 t (2,617 long tons) normally and up to 2,972 t (2,925 long tons) at full combat load. The ship had a minimal superstructure, which consisted of a small conning tower and bridge structure. Her hull had a raised forecastle and quarterdeck, along with a pronounced ram bow. She was fitted with two pole masts. She had a crew of 14 officers and 243 enlisted men.

Her propulsion system consisted of two triple-expansion steam engines driving a pair of screw propellers. The engines were powered by ten coal-fired Marine-type water-tube boilers that were vented through a pair of funnels. They were designed to give 8,000 metric horsepower (7,900 ihp), for a top speed of 21.5 knots (39.8 km/h; 24.7 mph). Medusa carried 560 t (550 long tons) of coal, which gave her a range of 3,560 nautical miles (6,590 km; 4,100 mi) at 10 knots (19 km/h; 12 mph).

The ship was armed with ten 10.5 cm (4.1 in) SK L/40 guns in single pivot mounts. Two were placed side by side forward on the forecastle; six were located on the broadside in sponsons; and two were placed side by side aft. The guns could engage targets out to 12,200 m (13,300 yd). They were supplied with 1,000 rounds of ammunition, for 100 shells per gun. She was also equipped with two 45 cm (17.7 in) torpedo tubes with five torpedoes. They were submerged in the hull on the broadside.

The ship was protected by an armored deck that was 20 to 25 mm (0.79 to 0.98 in) thick. The deck sloped downward at the sides of the ship to provide a measure of protection against incoming fire. The conning tower had 80 mm (3.1 in) thick sides, and the guns were protected by 50 mm (2 in) thick gun shields.

== Service history ==
=== Pre-war career ===
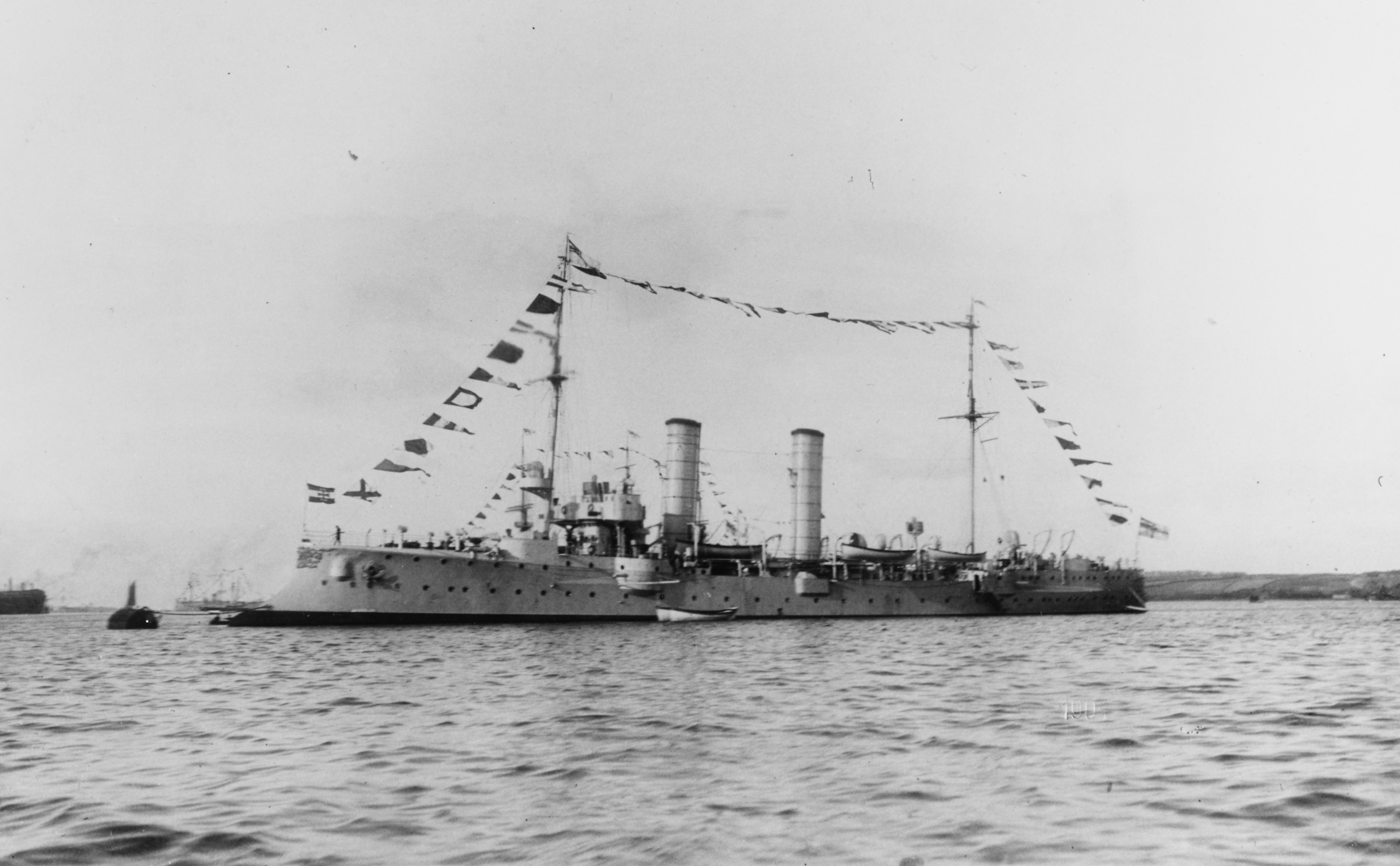
One of the Gazelle-class cruisers, possibly Medusa, in Kiel in 1901

Medusa was ordered under the contract name "E", (Note: German warships were ordered under provisional names. Additions to the fleet were given a single letter; ships intended to replace older or lost vessels were ordered as "Ersatz (name of the ship to be replaced)".) and was laid down at the AG Weser shipyard in Bremen on 22 January 1900. She was launched on 5 December 1900; at the launching ceremony, she was christened by Princess Augusta, the wife of Philipp, Prince of Eulenburg. The ship was named for the earlier screw corvette Medusa. She was moved to the Kaiserliche Werft (Imperial Shipyard) in Wilhelmshaven to have her armament installed. The ship was commissioned for sea trials on 26 July 1901 that lasted until 11 September, after which she was decommissioned due to crew shortages. She remained in reserve for the next two years.

Medusa was finally commissioned for active service on 1 April 1903, under the command of Korvettenkapitän (KK—Corvette Captain) William Kutter, thereafter joining the reconnaissance screen for I Battle Squadron. She took part in a cruise from May to June to Spain with the rest of the squadron that included a visit to Vigo, Spain, from 20 to 30 May. In July, she visited Stavanger, Norway, during the fleet cruise in the North Sea. The next year, she was present for a naval review in the Kieler Förde for King Edward VII of Great Britain during his visit to Germany. This was followed by a visit of the German fleet to Britain, after which Medusa stopped in the Netherlands from 14 to 20 July 1904. In September, Fregattenkapitän (FK—Frigate Captain) Paul Schlieper replaced Kutter as the ship's commander. She took part in fleet maneuvers in July and August 1905 that were conducted in Norwegian waters. During the exercises, she anchored off Uddevalla from 20 to 24 July. Following the maneuvers in September, KF Friedrich Schultz relieved Schlieper as the ship's captain. The fleet repeated the visit to Norway for maneuvers in July and August 1906; that year, Medusa visited Ålesund and Kristiansand. The fleet training maneuvers held in August and September concluded with a naval review in honor of the retiring fleet commander, Grossadmiral (Grand Admiral) Hans von Koester. Immediately afterward, KK Wilhelm Starke took command of the ship from Schultz. That year, Medusa's gunners earned the Schiesspreis (Shooting Prize) for small cruisers, awarded every year by Kaiser Wilhelm II.

The year 1907 passed uneventfully for Medusa, apart from during the annual fleet maneuvers on 7 September, when the ship suffered a machinery breakdown, forcing her to return to Kiel for repairs. On 15 September, she was replaced in the scout unit by the new cruiser SMS Königsberg. Four days later, Medusa in turn replaced her sister ship Nymphe as the gunnery training ship for automatic weapons in the Naval Artillery Inspectorate. At that time, KK Heinrich Trendtel replaced Starke as the ship's commander, though he remained aboard for just four months, being replaced in January 1908 by KK Jantzen. She served in this capacity for eight months during Nymphe's overhaul, thereafter being decommissioned on 23 May 1908 when her sister returned to service. Medusa was then overhauled and placed in reserve, where she remained for the next six years.

=== World War I ===
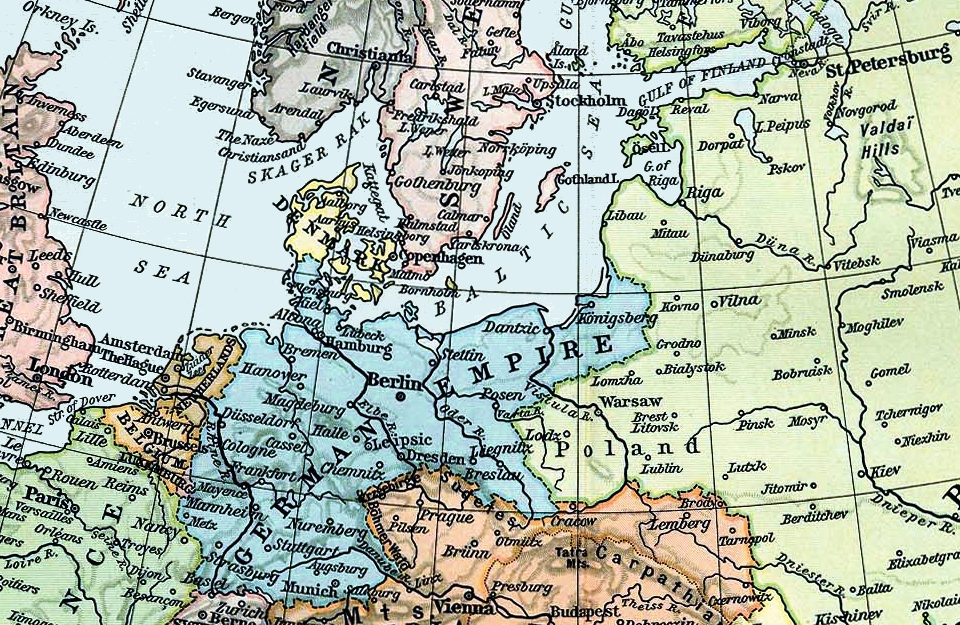
Map of the North and Baltic Seas in 1911

Following the outbreak of World War I in July 1914, Medusa was recommissioned on 4 August, under the command of FK Erich von Zeppelin. She was tasked with supporting the coastal patrol in the mouth of the Elbe on 11 August, where she remained through 13 September 1915. During this period, she patrolled the area and monitored shipping entering the Elbe without incident. The ship was transferred to Wilhelmshaven on 14 September, where her crew was reduced five days later. She was not decommissioned, however, and over the course of 30 November – 1 December, her crew was replenished and she was ordered to replace her sister Undine, which had been torpedoed and sunk in the western Baltic Sea. There, she joined the Coastal Defense Division. She arrived in Warnemünde on 26 December and began her patrol duties, which she performed for the next year. During this period, she also served as a target ship to train U-boat and torpedo boat crews. She was the flagship of Vizeadmiral (Vice Admiral) Robert Mischke from February to December 1916.

Medusa took Mischke on a tour of the central Baltic, cruising from Swinemünde to Danzig on 31 October 1916, then to Libau and then Memel before returning to Swinemünde on 7 November. By the end of the year, the naval command decided to withdraw Medusa from service, owing to her obsolescence in the face of modern weapons and to worsening crew shortages. She was accordingly decommissioned on 18 December in Kiel and then transferred to Flensburg. There, she was used as an auxiliary ship for the old ironclad König Wilhelm, which was being used as a training ship for naval cadets. Four of her guns were removed in 1917. Medusa served in that capacity for the remainder of the war, which ended on 11 November 1918.

=== Reichsmarine and Kriegsmarine career ===
Medusa was among the six light cruisers Germany was permitted to retain under the terms of the Treaty of Versailles that ended the war. The postwar Reichsmarine was obligated by the treaty to clear the minefields that had been laid in the North Sea during the war, and the command initially planned to convert Medusa into a mother ship for the planned 12th Minesweeper Half-Flotilla, but the unit was not created and Medusa therefore was not converted. Instead, she was recommissioned on 17 July 1920 with FK Alexander Werth as her captain, the first major warship to be commissioned in the interwar period. At that time, she was assigned to the Marinestation der Ostsee (Baltic Sea Naval Station), which also included two torpedo boat flotillas and the survey ship Triton. One of her first activities was to carry President Friedrich Ebert on a trip to East Prussia. She later visited foreign ports between 30 August and 5 September, including Fårösund and Visby on the island of Gotland in Sweden.

On 10 February 1921, the battleship Hannover was recommissioned, and at the same time relieved Medusa as the flagship. The two ships, along with both torpedo boat flotillas, conducted training exercises in June and July in the western Baltic. Medusa then made another series of visits to ports in the Baltic between 28 July and 2 August, including Uddevalla and Gothenburg, Sweden. She operated as an icebreaker in the Gulf of Riga from 24 January to 12 February 1922, and during this period she visited Windau, Latvia from 2 to 9 February. She next visited Gävle, Sweden from 22 to 26 June, followed by ports in Finland between 29 June and 3 July. In September, KK Ernst Meusel replaced Werth as the ship's captain; he was to be the vessel's last commanding officer. Medusa returned to Gothenburg from 11 to 15 July 1923 along with I Half-Flotilla, followed by stops in Molde on 19 July and then Åndalsnes, both in Norway. In October, the Marinestation was reorganized, since by this time enough battleships had been recommissioned to create a separate Battleship Division; Medusa became part of the light naval forces unit. From 5 to 12 July 1924, she visited Gävle again and on 26 September, she was decommissioned.

From 1 February 1928, Medusa began to serve as a barracks ship for torpedo boat and destroyer crews in Wilhelmshaven. On 29 March 1929, she was stricken from the naval register. In July 1940, during World War II, Medusa was converted into a floating anti-aircraft battery at the Rickmers Reederei shipyard in Bremerhaven. Her armament at that point consisted of one 10.5 cm SK C/32 gun, four 10.5 cm SK C/33 guns, two 3.7 cm (1.5 in) SK C/30 guns, and four 2 cm (0.79 in) Flak guns. She was then assigned to Naval Anti-aircraft Group 222, and remained in the harbor at Wilhelmshaven, anchored off Varel, beginning on 13 August 1940. She remained there for the duration of the war. On 19 April 1945, she was badly damaged by an Allied air attack that killed twenty-three and wounded forty-one of her crew. Her remaining crew scuttled the ship on 3 May, days before the end of the war in Europe. British occupation troops found the wreck lying next to the Wiesbaden Bridge. The wreck was ultimately salvaged in 1948–1950 and broken up for scrap.
