= Gazelle-class cruiser =

Light cruisers of the Imperial German Navy

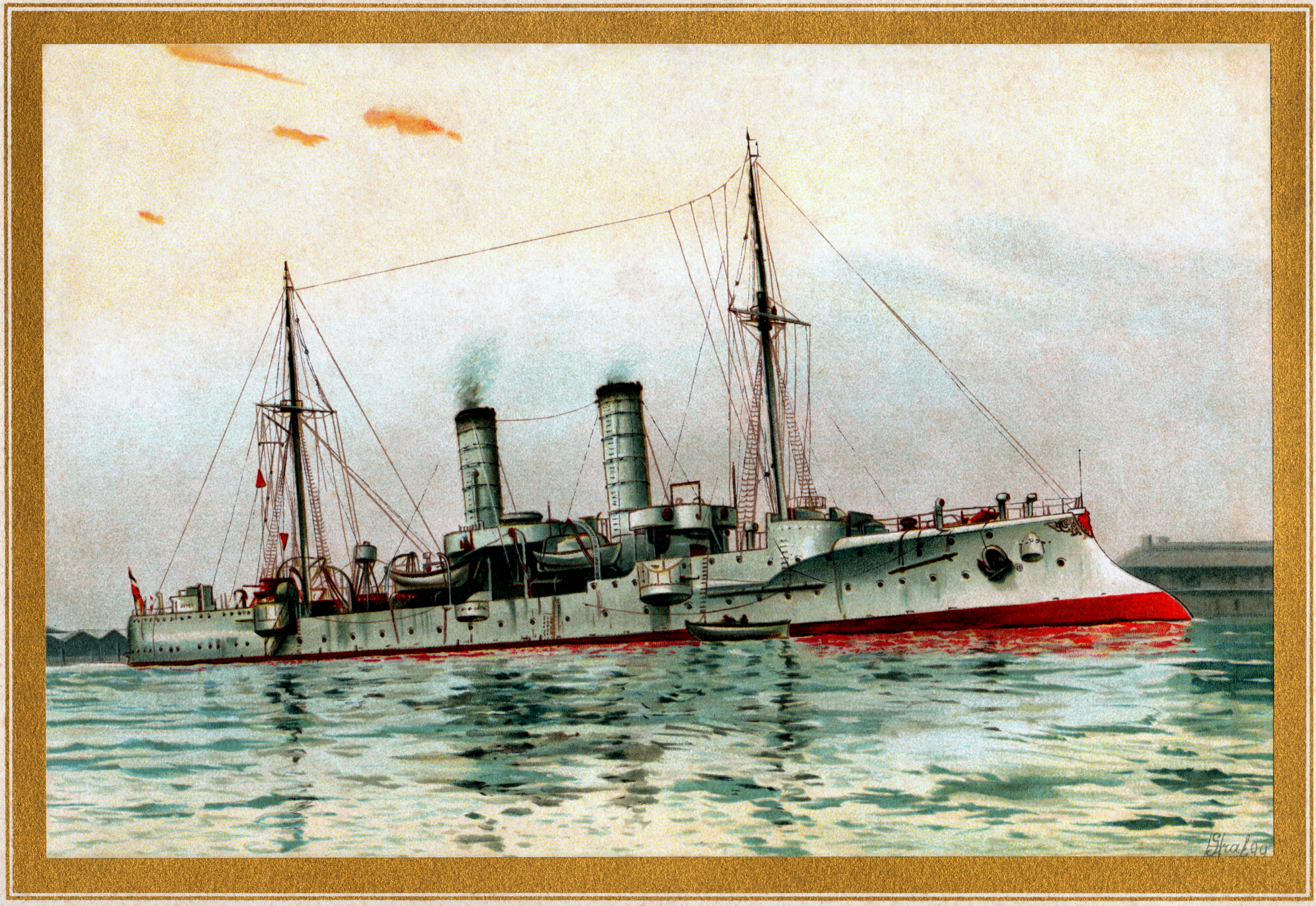
- A 1902 lithograph of Gazelle

Class overview
- Builders: AG Weser (5); Friedrich Krupp Germaniawerft (3); Howaldtswerke (1); Kaiserliche Werft Danzig (1)
- Operators: Imperial German Navy; Reichsmarine; Kriegsmarine; Royal Yugoslav Navy; Regia Marina
- Preceded by: SMS Hela
- Succeeded by: Bremen class
- Built: 1897–1904
- In service: 1900–1954
- Completed: 10
- Lost: 4
- Scrapped: 6

General characteristics
- Type: Light cruiser
- Displacement: Normal: 2,643 to 2,706 t (2,601 to 2,663 long tons); Full load: 2,963 to 3,180 t (2,916 to 3,130 long tons; 3,266 to 3,505 short tons)
- Length: 105 m (344 ft 6 in)
- Beam: 12.20 to 12.40 m (40 ft 0 in to 40 ft 8 in)
- Draft: 4.11 to 5.38 m (13 ft 6 in to 17 ft 8 in)
- Installed power: 8 × water-tube boilers; Gazelle: 6,000 ihp (4,500 kW); All others: 8,000 ihp (6,000 kW)
- Propulsion: 2 × screw propellers; 2 × triple-expansion steam engines
- Speed: Gazelle: 19.5 knots (36.1 km/h; 22.4 mph); All others: 21.5 knots (39.8 km/h; 24.7 mph)
- Range: 3,560 to 4,400 nmi (6,590 to 8,150 km; 4,100 to 5,060 mi)
- Complement: 14 officers; 243–256 enlisted men
- Armament: 10 × 10.5 cm SK L/40 guns; 2 × 45 cm (17.7 in) torpedo tubes
- Armor: Deck: 20 to 25 mm (0.79 to 0.98 in)

The Gazelle class was a group of ten light cruisers built for the Imperial German Navy at the turn of the 20th century. They were the first modern light cruiser design of the Imperial Navy, and set the basic pattern for all future light cruisers in Imperial service. The design of the Gazelle class attempted to merge the fleet scout with the colonial cruiser. They were armed with a main battery of ten 10.5 cm (4.1 in) guns and a pair of torpedo tubes, and were capable of a speed of 21.5 knots (39.8 km/h; 24.7 mph).

All ten ships served with the fleet when they were first commissioned, and several served on foreign stations in the decade before the outbreak of World War I. Most were used as coastal defense ships early in the war. Ariadne was sunk at the Battle of Heligoland Bight in August 1914, Undine was torpedoed in the Baltic by a British submarine in November 1915, and Frauenlob was sunk at the Battle of Jutland in May 1916. The rest survived the war to see service with the Reichsmarine, with the exception of Gazelle, which was broken up in 1920.

Niobe was sold to Yugoslavia in 1925 and renamed Dalmacija, and the rest of the cruisers were withdrawn from service by the end of the 1920s and used for secondary duties or broken up for scrap. Medusa and Arcona were converted into anti-aircraft ships in 1940 and were scuttled at the end of World War II. Dalmacija was captured twice during the war, first by the Italians, who renamed her Cattaro, and then by the Germans, who restored the original name of Niobe. She ran aground in December 1943 and was subsequently destroyed by British Motor Torpedo Boats. Amazone was the only member to survive the war intact, as a barracks ship, and she remained in service until 1954, when she was broken up for scrap.

== Design ==
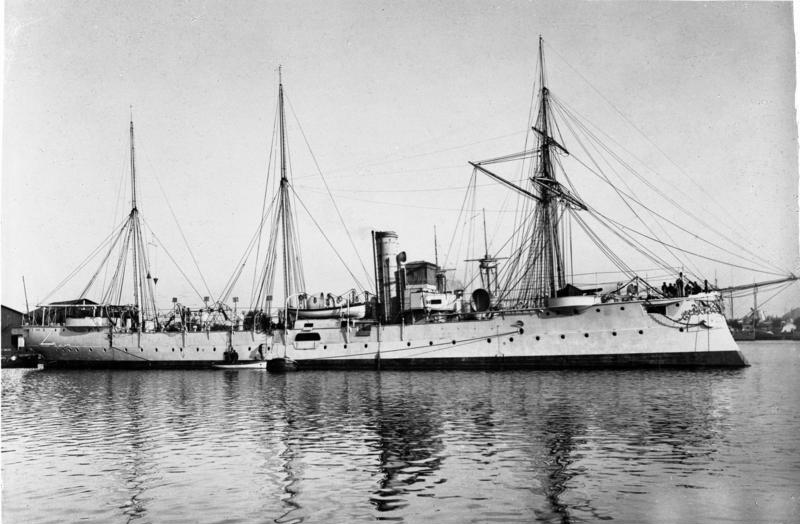
SMS Geier of the Bussard class, one of the predecessor types that led to the Gazelle design

Through the 1870s and early 1880s, Germany built two types of cruising vessels: small, fast, but lightly armed avisos suitable for service as fleet scouts and larger, long-ranged screw corvettes capable of patrolling the German colonial empire. Beginning in the mid-1880s, General Leo von Caprivi, the Chief of the Imperial Admiralty, embarked on a construction program to modernize Germany's cruiser force. The first step in the program, the two Schwalbe-class unprotected cruisers, provided the basis for the larger Bussard class. All of these vessels were comparatively slow, capable of no more than 15.5 knots (28.7 km/h; 17.8 mph), which was not sufficient for scout operations with the main fleet.

In the early 1890s, naval officers began to consider a new type of cruiser that incorporated the speed of the avisos with the heavier armament and longer cruising radius of the unprotected cruisers. Then-Captain Alfred von Tirpitz, at the time the Chief of Staff of the Imperial Naval High Command (Oberkommando der Marine—OKM), wrote a summary of 1894 fleet maneuvers that included what he believed to be the necessary characteristics of a new small cruiser. These included a top speed of at least 18 knots (33 km/h; 21 mph), armament sufficient to permit them to engage enemy fleet scouts, and an armor deck to protect the ship's propulsion machinery.

Plan, profile, and cross-section of the Gazelle class

The General Department of the Imperial Naval Office (Reichsmarineamt—RMA) issued a call for proposals on 10 May 1895 for the next cruiser, provisionally titled "G". Records of the initial proposals have not survived, though the final design closely followed Tirpitz's specifications outlined in 1894. The caliber of the main battery had to be limited to 10.5 cm (4.1 in), despite his preference for larger weapons, to keep displacement within reasonable limits. Maximum speed was to be 19.5 knots (36.1 km/h; 22.4 mph), a margin of 3 knots (5.6 km/h; 3.5 mph) over contemporary battleship designs. The design for the first vessel, which would become Gazelle, was prepared in 1895–1896 by the navy's chief designer, Alfred Dietrich. As additional members of the class were ordered, a series of improvements were incorporated in their designs over the course of 1897–1900.

By 1897, when the second member of the class would be proposed to the Reichstag to be included in the next year's budget, developments in other vessels prompted the first of these changes. The latest Kaiser Friedrich III-class battleships would have a speed of 18 knots (33 km/h; 21 mph), necessitating an increase in speed to maintain the 3-knot speed advantage. The RMA also considered increasing the caliber of main guns in line with Tirpitz's thinking, but Dietrich stated that the requested improvements could not be incorporated while retaining a displacement of not more than 3,000 metric tons (2,953 long tons). More problematically, the cost of the new ship would increase by around 26 percent, which the Reichstag would not likely approve. As a result, the next vessel would largely repeat Gazelle's design, though new machinery developed by the Germaniawerft shipyard secured the necessary increase of speed to 21.5 knots (39.8 km/h; 24.7 mph).

The design was somewhat smaller than contemporary light cruisers, but the ships were nevertheless sturdy and powerfully armed for the period. These characteristics evenly balanced the requirements for the two roles envisioned for the class. According to the historian Eric Osborne, "[t]he light cruisers of the Gazelle-class established a trend for future ships of this general design...[they] carried little or no armor, the chief asset being speed." Indeed, all future light cruisers built by the Imperial Navy through the Dresden class of 1906 generally followed the same pattern, with few fundamental changes.

=== General characteristics ===
Medusa passing under the Levensau High Bridge in the Kaiser Wilhelm Canal

The ships of the Gazelle class were 104.10 to 104.40 m (341 ft 6 in to 342 ft 6 in) long at the waterline and 105 meters (344 ft 6 in) long overall. The first seven ships had a beam of 12.20 m (40 ft 0 in) and the last three were slightly wider, at 12.40 m (40 ft 8 in). They had a draft of 4.11 to 5.38 m (13 ft 6 in to 17 ft 8 in) forward and 5.31 to 5.69 m (17 ft 5 in to 18 ft 8 in) aft. They were designed to displace 2,643 to 2,706 metric tons (2,601 to 2,663 long tons) at a normal loading, and at full load their displacement rose to 2,963 to 3,180 t (2,916 to 3,130 long tons; 3,266 to 3,505 short tons). The ships' hulls were constructed with transverse and longitudinal steel frames; the outer hull wall consisted of wooden planks covered with a layer of Muntz metal to prevent fouling. The Muntz metal extended up to a meter above the waterline. The hull was divided into twelve watertight compartments and it had a double bottom that extended for 40 percent of the length of the keel. For the last three ships, their double bottom was lengthened to 46 percent of the hull.

All ten ships were crank and rolled severely. They were also wet in a head sea. After their modernizations, they tended to suffer from lee helm. Nevertheless, the ships turned tightly and were very maneuverable. In a hard turn, their speed fell up to 65 percent. They had a transverse metacentric height of 0.5 to 0.63 m (1 ft 8 in to 2 ft 1 in). The Gazelle class required a crew of 14 officers and 243 enlisted men, though for the last three ships, the number of enlisted men rose to 256. They carried a number of boats, including one picket boat, one pinnace, two cutters, two yawls, and one dinghy.

=== Machinery ===
Their propulsion system consisted of two triple-expansion engines manufactured by the dockyards that built the ships. Gazelle's engines were designed to give 6,000 indicated horsepower (4,500 kW), for a top speed of 19.5 knots (36.1 km/h; 22.4 mph), while the rest of the ships' engines were rated at 8,000 ihp (6,000 kW) for 21.5 knots (39.8 km/h; 24.7 mph). The engines were powered by eight coal-fired water-tube boilers of various manufacture, divided into two boiler rooms. The first three ships carried 500 tonnes (490 long tons) of coal, which gave them a range of 3,570 nautical miles (6,610 km; 4,110 mi) at 10 knots (19 km/h; 12 mph). The next four vessels carried slightly more, at 560 t (550 long tons), which allowed them to cruise to the approximately same range, 3,560 nmi (6,590 km; 4,100 mi), at the higher speed of 12 knots (22 km/h; 14 mph). The last three ships carried 700 t (690 long tons) of coal, which substantially increased their cruising radius, to 4,400 nmi (8,100 km; 5,100 mi) at 12 knots. The ships were equipped with three electricity generators that provided a total of 110 kilowatts at 110 volts.

=== Armament and armor ===
The ships were armed with ten 10.5 cm SK L/40 guns in single mounts. Two were placed side by side forward on the forecastle, six were located amidships, three on either side, and two were placed side by side aft. The guns could engage targets out to 12,200 m (13,300 yd). They were supplied with 1,000 rounds of ammunition, for 100 shells per gun, though the allotment for the last three ships increased to 1,500 rounds, or 150 per gun. They were also equipped with torpedo tubes. Gazelle had three 45 cm (17.7 in) tubes with eight torpedoes; one was submerged in the hull in the bow and two were mounted in deck launchers on the broadside. The rest of the class only had two 45 cm tubes with five torpedoes, and these were submerged in the ships' hulls, on the broadside.

The ships were protected by an armored deck that was 20 to 25 mm (0.79 to 0.98 in) thick, with 50 mm (2.0 in) thick sloping armor on the side. The armor consisted of two layers of steel with a single layer of Krupp steel. The Gazelle-class cruisers were also equipped with cork cofferdams to increase buoyancy. The conning tower had 80 mm (3.1 in) thick sides, with a 20 mm thick roof. The guns were protected by 50 mm (2.0 in) thick shields.

== Construction ==
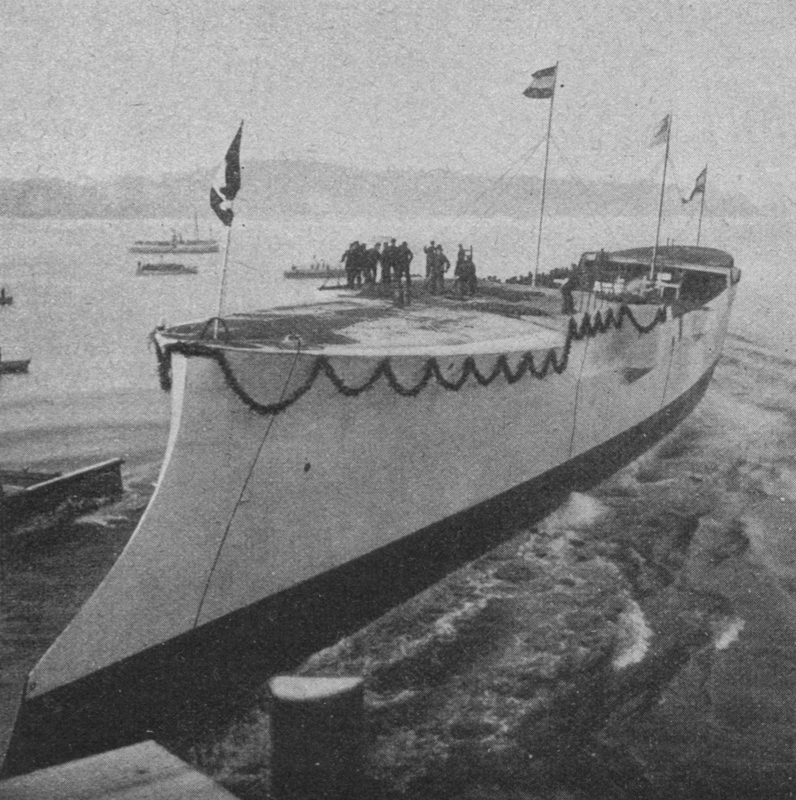
Undine at her launching

The ten ships of the Gazelle class were built between 1897 and 1904, at various German dockyards, including private firms and government shipyards.

Construction data
Name	Builder	Laid down	Launched	Commissioned
Gazelle	Germaniawerft, Kiel	1897	31 March 1898	15 June 1901
Niobe	AG Weser, Bremen	1898	18 July 1899	25 June 1900
Nymphe	Germaniawerft, Kiel	1898	21 November 1899	20 September 1900
Thetis	Kaiserliche Werft Danzig	1899	3 July 1900	14 September 1901
Ariadne	AG Weser, Bremen	1899	10 August 1900	18 May 1901
Amazone	Germaniawerft, Kiel	1899	6 October 1900	15 November 1901
Medusa	AG Weser, Bremen	1900	5 December 1900	26 July 1901
Frauenlob	AG Weser, Bremen	1901	22 March 1902	17 February 1903
Arcona	AG Weser, Bremen	1901	22 April 1902	12 May 1903
Undine	Howaldtswerke, Kiel	1901	11 December 1902	5 January 1904

== Service history ==
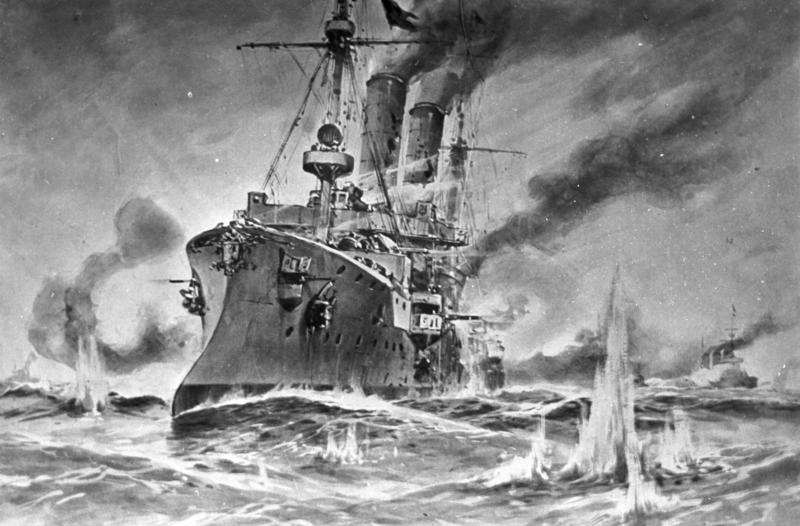
Ariadne at Heligoland Bight, 1914

The Gazelle-class cruisers served in various capacities after their commissioning. Most of them served with the fleet reconnaissance force, though several served on foreign stations as well. Gazelle served abroad in 1902–1904, Thetis in 1902–1906, Niobe in 1906–1909, and Arcona in 1907–1910. Nymphe was also used as a training ship for naval cadets in addition to her fleet scout role, and Undine served as a gunnery training ship.

Due to their age, the Gazelles had been placed in reserve by 1914, but after the outbreak of World War I in August 1914, they were mobilized for active service. Most were initially used as coastal defense vessels in the Baltic, but Frauenlob and Ariadne remained in service with the fleet. They both saw action at the Battle of Heligoland Bight on 28 August 1914; Frauenlob engaged and badly damaged the British cruiser HMS Arethusa, while Ariadne was sunk by several battlecruisers. Frauenlob soldiered on in the fleet reconnaissance forces until the Battle of Jutland on 31 May 1916, when she was torpedoed and sunk by HMS Southampton in a ferocious night battle, with the loss of almost her entire crew. In the Baltic, Undine was torpedoed and sunk by the British submarine HMS E19 on 7 November 1915.

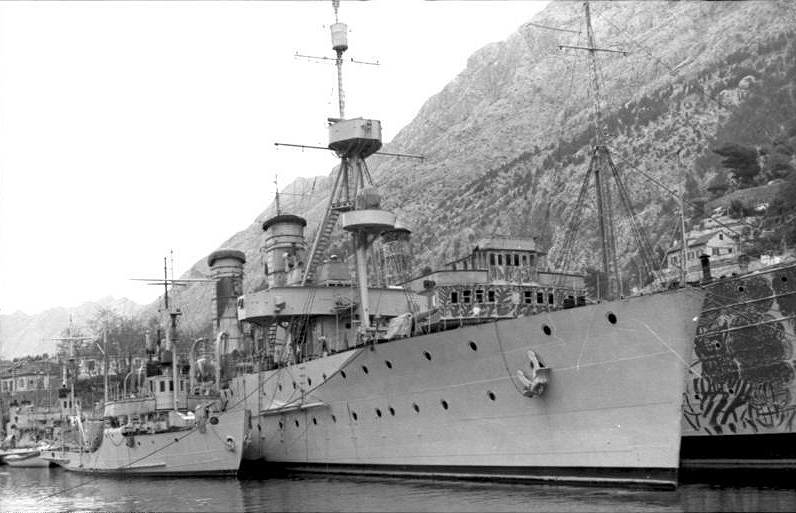
Niobe in Yugoslavian service, 1941.

The seven surviving ships were withdrawn from front-line service in 1916 and disarmed, with the exception of Medusa, which retained six of her guns, and Thetis, which was rearmed with nine 10.5 cm U-boat guns for use as a gunnery training ship. The remaining seven cruisers survived the war and went on to serve in the new Reichsmarine, except for Gazelle, which was broken up for scrap in 1920. The ships remained in service throughout the 1920s, but were all withdrawn by the early 1930s. Niobe was sold to Yugoslavia in 1925 and renamed Dalmacija, while Nymphe and Thetis were scrapped in the early 1930s. Arcona, Medusa, and Amazone were used as barracks hulks for the rest of the 1930s.

After the outbreak of World War II, Medusa and Arcona were converted into floating anti-aircraft batteries and defended German ports from 1940 to the end of the war, when they were scuttled by their crews on 3 May 1945. Amazone meanwhile remained in service as a barracks ship through the end of the war. Dalmacija was captured by the Italians after the Invasion of Yugoslavia in April 1941, renamed Cattaro, and pressed into service with the Italian Navy. She was then captured by the Germans after the Italian surrender in September 1943, and returned to her original name, Niobe. The ship ran aground in the Adriatic in December 1943 and was destroyed by a pair of British Motor Torpedo Boats. Niobe, Medusa, and Arcona were broken up for scrap in the late 1940s, but Amazone lingered on as a barracks ship until 1954, when she too was sold for scrapping.
