= SMS Nymphe (1899) =

Light cruiser of the German Imperial Navy

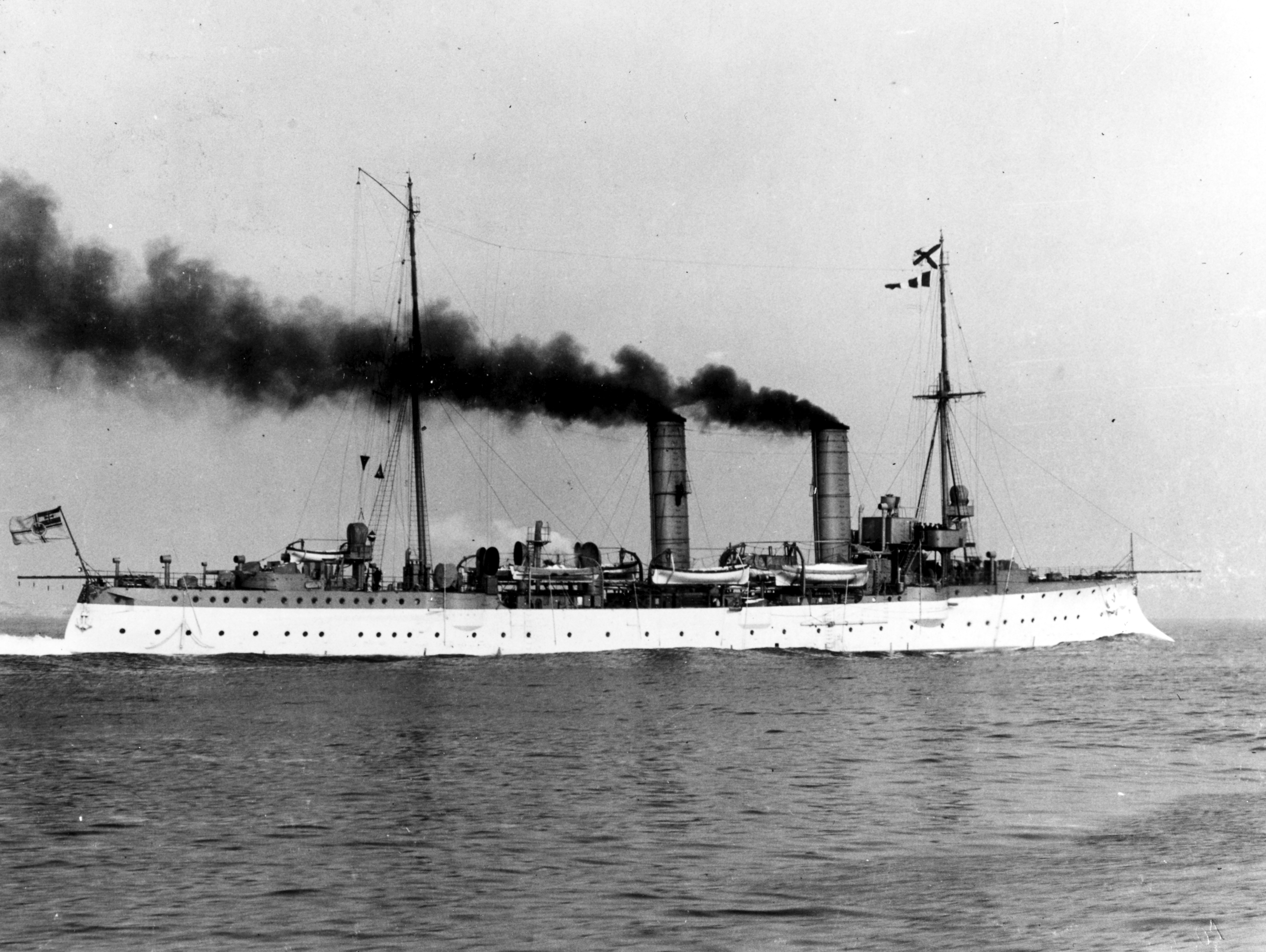
- SMS Nymphe circa 1901

History

German Empire
- Name: Nymphe
- Laid down: November 1898
- Launched: 21 November 1899
- Commissioned: 20 September 1900
- Stricken: 31 August 1931
- Fate: Scrapped, 1932

General characteristics
- Class & type: Gazelle-class cruiser
- Displacement: Normal: 2,659 t (2,617 long tons); Full load: 3,017 t (2,969 long tons)
- Length: 105.1 m (344.8 ft) loa
- Beam: 12.2 m (40 ft)
- Draft: 4.11 m (13.5 ft)
- Installed power: 10 × water-tube boilers; 8,000 PS (7,900 ihp)
- Propulsion: 2 × triple-expansion steam engines; 2 × screw propellers
- Speed: 21.5 knots (39.8 km/h; 24.7 mph)
- Range: 3,570 nmi (6,610 km; 4,110 mi) at 10 kn (19 km/h; 12 mph)
- Complement: 14 officers; 243 enlisted men
- Armament: 10 × 10.5 cm (4.1 in) SK L/40 guns; 2 × 45 cm (17.7 in) torpedo tubes
- Armor: Deck: 20 to 25 mm (0.79 to 0.98 in); Conning tower 80 mm (3.1 in); Gun shields: 50 mm (2 in)

SMS Nymphe was the third member of the ten-ship Gazelle class of light cruisers that were built for the German Kaiserliche Marine (Imperial Navy) in the late 1890s and early 1900s. The Gazelle class was the culmination of earlier unprotected cruiser and aviso designs, combining the best aspects of both types in what became the progenitor of all future light cruisers of the Imperial fleet. Built to be able to serve with the main German fleet and as a colonial cruiser, she was armed with a battery of ten 10.5 cm (4.1 in) guns and a top speed of 21.5 knots (39.8 km/h; 24.7 mph).

The ship spent the majority of her prewar career serving as a training ship, first with the Torpedo Inspectorate and then with the Naval Artillery Inspectorate. During this period, she also frequently escorted Kaiser Wilhelm II during cruises aboard his yacht, Hohenzollern to visit foreign countries. She was decommissioned in 1909 and remained out of service until August 1914, when World War I led to her reactivation to support coastal defense forces in the mouth of the Elbe river through late 1915. She was used as a barracks ship and stationary training ship for the rest of the war.

Nymphe was one of the six cruisers Germany was allowed to keep in service by the Treaty of Versailles, and she was modernized in the early 1920s before being recommissioned in 1924. She served as the flagship of the fleet's light forces in the Baltic Sea through the 1920s, during which time she made two major training cruises into the Atlantic and the Mediterranean Sea. The ship was decommissioned in 1929 and employed as a barracks ship until 1931, when she was struck from the naval register and sold to ship breakers. She was dismantled in 1932 in Hamburg.

== Design ==
Following the construction of the unprotected cruisers of the Bussard class and the aviso Hela for the German Kaiserliche Marine (Imperial Navy), the Construction Department of the Reichsmarineamt (Imperial Navy Office) prepared a design for a new small cruiser that combined the best attributes of both types of vessels. The designers had to design a small cruiser with armor protection that had an optimal combination of speed, armament, and stability necessary for fleet operations, along with the endurance to operate on foreign stations in the German colonial empire. The resulting Gazelle design provided the basis for all of the light cruisers built by the German fleet to the last official designs prepared in 1914. Nymphe, the third member of the class, dispensed with the wood and copper sheathing of the hull that the first two vessels had carried. All subsequent vessels copied that change.

Plan, profile, and cross-section of the Gazelle class

Nymphe was 105.1 meters (344 ft 10 in) long overall and had a beam of 12.2 m (40 ft) and a draft of 4.11 m (13 ft 6 in) forward. She displaced 2,659 t (2,617 long tons) normally and up to 3,017 t (2,969 long tons) at full combat load. The ship had a minimal superstructure, which consisted of a small conning tower and bridge structure. Her hull had a raised forecastle and quarterdeck, along with a pronounced ram bow. She was fitted with two pole masts. She had a crew of 14 officers and 243 enlisted men.

Her propulsion system consisted of two triple-expansion steam engines manufactured by Germaniawerft, driving a pair of screw propellers. The engines were powered by ten coal-fired Marine-type water-tube boilers that were vented through a pair of funnels. They were designed to give 8,000 metric horsepower (7,900 ihp), for a top speed of 21.5 knots (39.8 km/h; 24.7 mph). Nymphe carried 500 t (490 long tons) of coal, which gave her a range of 3,570 nautical miles (6,610 km; 4,110 mi) at 10 knots (19 km/h; 12 mph).

The ship was armed with ten 10.5 cm (4.1 in) SK L/40 guns in single pivot mounts. Two were placed side by side forward on the forecastle; six were located on the broadside in sponsons; and two were placed side by side aft. The guns could engage targets out to 12,200 m (13,300 yd). They were supplied with 1,000 rounds of ammunition, for 100 shells per gun. She was also equipped with two 45 cm (17.7 in) torpedo tubes with five torpedoes. They were submerged in the hull on the broadside.

The ship was protected by an armored deck that was 20 to 25 mm (0.79 to 0.98 in) thick. The deck sloped downward at the sides of the ship to provide a measure of protection against incoming fire. The conning tower had 80 mm (3.1 in) thick sides, and the guns were protected by 50 mm (2 in) thick gun shields.

== Service history ==
=== Construction – 1904 ===
Nymphe c. 1901–1904

Nymphe was ordered under the contract name "A", (Note: German warships were ordered under provisional names. Additions to the fleet were given a single letter; ships intended to replace older or lost vessels were ordered as "Ersatz (name of the ship to be replaced)".) and was laid down at the Germaniawerft shipyard in Kiel in November 1898. She was launched on 21 November 1899, and the Bürgermeister (Mayor) of Lübeck gave a speech. After fitting-out work was completed, she was commissioned for sea trials on 20 September 1900. Her first commander was Kapitän zur See (KzS—Captain at Sea) Hugo Zeye. Her initial testing was interrupted in January 1901 when she was sent to escort Hohenzollern, the yacht of Kaiser Wilhelm II, during Wilhelm's visit to Britain for the funeral of his grandmother, Queen Victoria. Nymphe lay off Portsmouth from 26 January to 5 February, thereafter visiting Sheerness, Britain, and then Vlissingen, Netherlands. She arrived back in German waters on 8 February and resumed trials, which were completed the following month. She was then assigned to the Torpedo Inspectorate, which used her as a torpedo testing ship, a role Nymphe filled for the next four years. At the same time, Korvettenkapitän (KK—Corvette Captain) Georg Scheibel replaced Zeye. In June 1901, Nymphe again escorted Hohenzollern during the Kiel Week sailing regatta. She took part in the annual fleet training maneuvers held in August and September, which concluded with a naval review held while Tsar Nicholas II of Russia visited Germany. In October, KK Günther von Krosigk relieved Scheibel as the ship's commander.

The year 1902 saw the ship escort Hohenzollern three times in addition to her torpedo testing duties: the first to Kiel Week in June, followed by a cruise to Norway in July; the second in August during a visit to Reval for another meeting with Nicholas, during which Nymphe and other German vessels took part in combined fleet maneuvers with elements of the Russian Baltic Fleet; the third on November for a visit to Britain for Wilhelm to visit his uncle, King Edward VII. Between the last two trips, Nymphe took part in the fleet maneuvers held in late August and early September, and Kapitänleutnant (KL—Captain Lieutenant) Albertus Petruschky briefly took command of the ship from September to October, followed by KK Voit. At the end of the year, her crew was temporarily reduced for periodic maintenance over the winter months.

KL Wilibald Grauer briefly commanded the vessel from January to February, when he was replaced by Voit. Nymphe once again accompanied Hohenzollern that year during the Kaiser's visit to Copenhagen, Denmark, from 2 to 6 April to visit King Christian IX, again for that year's Kiel Week in June, and for Wilhelm's cruise to Norway in July. Nymphe arrived back in Swinemünde on 11 August and she then joined the fleet for the annual maneuvers held later that month and into September. As in the previous year, she spent the winter with a reduced crew undergoing repairs, now under KK Wilhelm Sthamer's command. In December, he was replaced by Grauer. After recommissioning in 1904, she embarked on a training cruise to Norwegian waters with the torpedo testing ship Neptun (the former armored frigate Friedrich Carl) that lasted from 16 March to 3 April and included torpedo test firings. Nymphe took part in that year's fleet maneuvers as well, and in September, KK Leberecht Maass became the ship's captain.

=== 1905–1914 ===
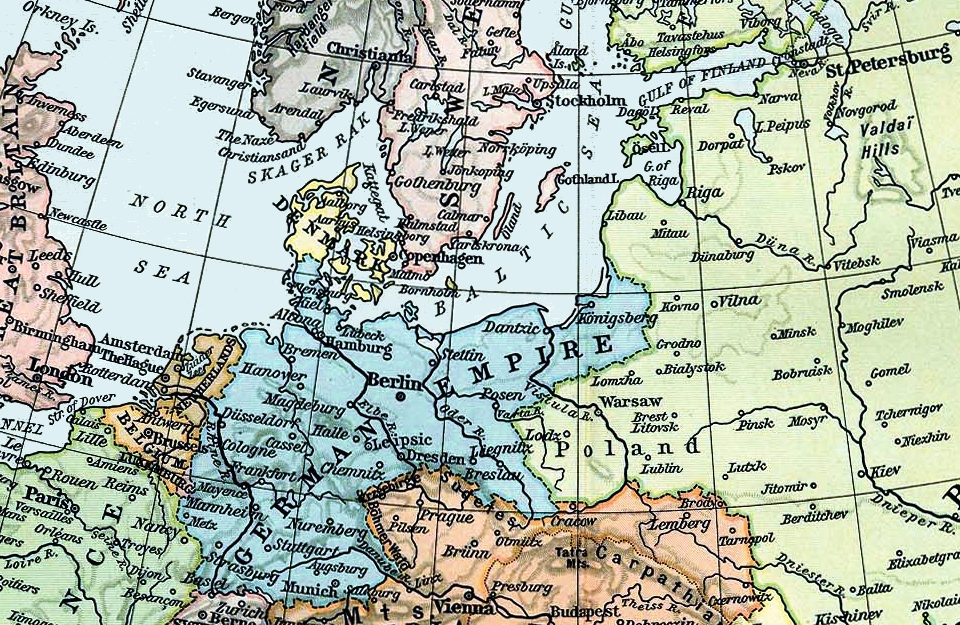
Map of the North and Baltic Seas in 1911

On 11 January 1905, Nymphe was replaced as the primary torpedo testing ship by the new pre-dreadnought battleship Schwaben, and on 30 March, Nymphe in turn relieved the old screw corvette Olga. At the same time, KK Karl Behm became the ship's commander, serving until September that year. Nymphe was accordingly transferred from the Torpedo Inspectorate to the Naval Artillery Inspectorate, where she served for the next two years. She took part in her first set of exercises in the new unit in May 1905. She was present for the high seas regatta held between the island of Helgoland and Dover, Britain. From 1 to 7 August, she cruised with her sister ship Undine and three old torpedo boats filled with cork for use as torpedo targets.

In January 1906, Behm returned to the ship. Nymphe operated with the training vessels of the German fleet, now organized as the School and Testing Ships Unit, in April and May 1906. She reprised her participation in the Dover–Helgoland regatta that June. KK Heinrich Trendtel replaced now-Fregattenkapitän (FK—Frigate Captain) Behm. During exercises in the western Baltic Sea on 17 November, Undine collided with and sank the torpedo boat S126; Nymphe assisted with the rescue effort for the torpedo boat's crew. Nymphe continued in her gunnery training duties, which included fleet shooting practice in April 1907 in the German Bight for the first time; up to that point, her training operations had been confined to the Baltic. She may have also taken part in fleet maneuvers in the area at that time.

In May and June, she was dry-docked in the Kaiserliche Werft (Imperial Shipyard) in Wilhelmshaven to be rearmed. She retained six of her 10.5 cm guns, but the four on her starboard side were replaced with four 8.8 cm (3.5 in) guns and two 5.2 cm (2 in) guns to diversify the types of guns available for training. She was thereafter designated the "training ship for automatic weapons". The ship was recommissioned on 2 July; during the fleet maneuvers in August, she served with the temporarily created III (Maneuver) Squadron. While engaged in the maneuvers on 31 August, the coastal defense ship Frithjof accidentally rammed Nymphe aft on her port side; Nymphe was forced to go to Kiel, where she was decommissioned on 19 September for repairs. After the work was completed, Nymphe was moved to Danzig without being recommissioned. Medusa, which had replaced Nymphe, was due for scheduled maintenance by early 1908, so Nymphe was recommissioned on 23 May to take her place, serving until February 1909. During this period, she was based at Sonderburg, until she was relieved by the newer cruiser Stuttgart. The ship was then decommissioned and placed in reserve, where she remained for the next five years.

=== World War I ===
Following the start of World War I in July 1914, Nymphe was recommissioned on 8 August to serve as the flagship of the harbor flotilla that guarded the mouth of the Elbe. Whether she received her original battery of ten 10.5 cm guns or retained her gunnery training ship armament is not known. The commander of the flotilla was FK Ernst Ewers, who also served as Nymphe's captain. In January 1915, Ewers was replaced in both roles by FK Erich von Zeppelin. The ship saw little activity during this period, and in August 1915, Zeppelin left the ship, which was then removed from front-line service on 1 September. She thereafter was assigned to the Torpedo Inspectorate, reverting to her original role as a torpedo training ship. She served in this capacity until 1 November 1916, when she was decommissioned and then disarmed. She remained assigned to the Torpedo Inspectorate, which used her as a barracks ship and as a stationary training vessel.

=== Reichsmarine career ===
Nymphe was among the six light cruisers that Germany was permitted to retain under the terms of the Treaty of Versailles that ended the war. She was taken to Wilhelmshaven on 4 November 1920, where from November 1922 to early 1924 she was modernized at the Deutsche Werke shipyard. Her original ram bow was replaced with a modern clipper bow, which increased her overall length to 108.7 m (357 ft). She also received a new mast, along with a new battery of 10.5 cm SK L/45 guns in U-boat mountings. A pair of 50 cm (20 in) torpedo tubes in deck-mounted launchers were also installed. She was recommissioned on 30 November 1924 for sea trials, with KzS Ernst Bindseil as her first commander in the new Reichsmarine (Navy of the Realm). She was then assigned to serve as the flagship of light Naval Forces of the Baltic Sea on 18 December, under the command of Konteradmiral (KAdm—Rear Admiral) Iwan Oldekop. FK Georg Kleine relieved Bindseil as the ship's commander in January 1925. In addition to routine training exercises that year, the ship visited Merok, Norway, from 25 to 30 June. KAdm Franz Wieting replaced Oldekop as the unit commander on 25 September.

In 1926, Nymphe took part in a major training cruise into the Atlantic and the Mediterranean Sea, during which she made several stops in Spain, including Cádiz from 20 to 24 May, Mahón, Menorca, from 27 to 29 May, Málaga from 1 to 8 June, and Vigo from 12 to 13 June. After returning to Germany, she took part in the fleet maneuvers held in August. From 4 to 5 September, she visited Skagen, Denmark, after which FK Fritz Conrad replaced Kleine as the ship's captain. KzS Wilfried von Loewenfeld replaced Wieting on 16 March 1927. The ship made more foreign visits that year, and while in the Bay of Biscay, she was damaged in severe weather that saw wind strength in the range of 10–12 on the Beaufort scale. She stopped in Ferrol from 2 to 14 April, Santa Cruz from 17 to 20 April, La Luz in Málaga from 24 April to 2 May, Lanzarote in the Canary Islands from 3 to 9 May, Horta and Ponta Delgada in the Azores from 14 to 23 May and from 24 to 29 May, respectively, Seville from 3 to 7 June, and Cádiz from 7 to 8 June. She once again took part in fleet maneuvers upon her return to Germany.

Nymphe participated in a fleet cruise to Norway in July 1928, which included stops in Bergen and Ulvik. Following the fleet's return to Germany, it conducted another set of training exercises, and in September, FK Wolf von Trotha relieved Conrad, serving as the ship's last commander. On 15 October, KAdm Walter Gladisch replaced Loewenfeld, though Nymphe remained the flagship for just six months, being decommissioned on 16 April 1929 in Kiel; her role was taken by the new light cruiser Königsberg. Nymphe was briefly retained as a barracks ship until 31 March 1931, when she was struck from the naval register. She was sold on 29 August and then broken up the following year in Hamburg.
