= SMS Danzig (1905) =

Light cruiser of the German Imperial Navy

- Danzig shortly after entering service

History

German Empire
- Name: Danzig
- Laid down: 1904
- Launched: 23 September 1905
- Commissioned: 1 December 1907
- Decommissioned: 25 March 1918
- Stricken: 5 November 1919
- Fate: Scrapped, 1922–1923

General characteristics
- Class & type: Bremen-class cruiser
- Displacement: Normal: 3,278 t (3,226 long tons); Full load: 3,783 t (3,723 long tons)
- Length: Length overall: 111.1 meters (365 ft)
- Beam: 13.3 m (43.6 ft)
- Draft: 5.68 m (18.6 ft)
- Installed power: 10 × water-tube boilers; 10,000 PS (9,900 ihp)
- Propulsion: 2 × screw propellers; 2 × triple-expansion steam engines
- Speed: 22 knots (41 km/h; 25 mph)
- Range: 4,690 nmi (8,690 km; 5,400 mi) at 12 kn (22 km/h; 14 mph)
- Complement: 14 officers; 274–287 enlisted men
- Armament: 10 × 10.5 cm (4.1 in) SK L/40 guns; 10 × 3.7 cm (1.5 in) Maxim guns; 2 × 45 cm (17.7 in) torpedo tubes
- Armor: Deck: 80 mm (3.1 in); Conning tower: 100 mm (3.9 in); Gun shields: 50 mm (2 in)

SMS Danzig (Note: "SMS" stands for "Seiner Majestät Schiff" (German: His Majesty's Ship).) was a light cruiser of the Imperial German Navy. Named for the city of Danzig (now Gdańsk, Poland), she was the seventh and last ship of the Bremen class. She was begun by the Imperial Dockyard in her namesake city in 1904, launched on 23 September 1905 and commissioned on 1 December 1907. Armed with a main battery of ten 10.5 cm (4.1 in) guns and two 45 cm (18 in) torpedo tubes, Danzig was capable of a top speed of 22 knots (41 km/h; 25 mph).

Danzig spent the first ten years of her career in the reconnaissance forces of the High Seas Fleet. The ship saw extensive service during the First World War; she was present at the Battle of Heligoland Bight in August 1914, but did not engage British warships. She also saw action in the Baltic Sea against Russian forces, and was badly damaged by a Russian mine in November 1915. Danzig was also involved in Operation Albion, the seizure of the islands at the entrance of the Gulf of Riga, in September 1917. She was thereafter withdrawn from service, and surrendered to Britain after the end of the war as a war prize. Danzig was dismantled for scrap starting in 1921.

== Design ==
The German 1898 Naval Law called for the replacement of the fleet's older cruising vessels—steam corvettes, unprotected cruisers, and avisos—with modern light cruisers. The first tranche of vessels to fulfill this requirement, the Gazelle class, were designed to serve both as fleet scouts and as station ships in Germany's colonial empire. They provided the basis for subsequent designs, beginning with the Bremen class that was designed in 1901–1903. The principle improvements consisted of a larger hull that allowed for an additional pair of boilers and a higher top speed.

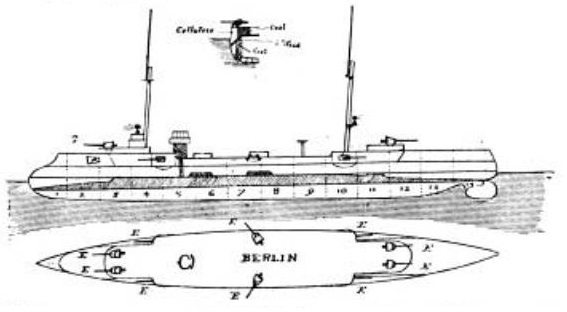
Plan and profile of the Bremen class

Danzig was 111.1 meters (365 ft) long overall and had a beam of 13.3 m (44 ft) and a draft of 5.68 m (18.6 ft) forward. She displaced 3,278 metric tons (3,226 long tons) as designed and up to 3,783 t (3,723 long tons) at full load. The ship had a minimal superstructure, which consisted of a small conning tower and bridge structure. Her hull had a raised forecastle and quarterdeck, along with a pronounced ram bow. She was fitted with two pole masts. She had a crew of 14 officers and 274–287 enlisted men.

Her propulsion system consisted of two triple-expansion steam engines driving a pair of screw propellers. Steam was provided by ten coal-fired Marine-type water-tube boilers, which were vented through three funnels located amidships. Her propulsion system was rated at 10,000 metric horsepower (9,900 ihp) for a top speed of 22 knots (41 km/h; 25 mph). Danzig carried up to 860 t (850 long tons) of coal, which gave her a range of 4,690 nautical miles (8,690 km; 5,400 mi) at 12 knots (22 km/h; 14 mph).

The ship was armed with a main battery of ten 10.5 cm (4.1 in) SK L/40 guns in single mounts. Two were placed side by side forward on the forecastle; six were located on the broadside, three on either side; and two were placed side by side aft. The guns could engage targets out to 12,200 m (13,300 yd). They were supplied with 1,500 rounds of ammunition, for 150 shells per gun. For defense against torpedo boats, she carried ten 3.7 cm (1.5 in) Maxim guns in individual mounts. She was also equipped with two 45 cm (17.7 in) torpedo tubes with five torpedoes. They were submerged in the hull on the broadside. Danzig was also fitted to carry fifty naval mines.

The ship was protected by a curved armored deck that was up to 80 mm (3.1 in) thick; it sloped down at the sides to provide a measure of protection against enemy fire. The conning tower had 100 mm (3.9 in) thick sides, and the guns were protected by 50 mm (2 in) thick gun shields.

== Service history ==
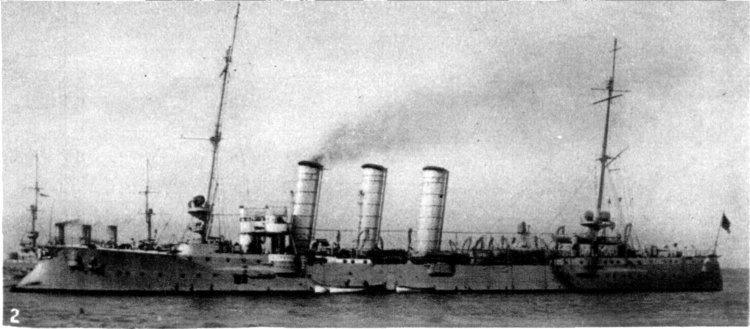
An unidentified member of the Bremen class

Danzig was ordered under the contract name Ersatz Alexandrine, (Note: German warships were ordered under provisional names. Additions to the fleet were given a single letter; ships intended to replace older or lost vessels were ordered as "Ersatz (name of the ship to be replaced)".) and was laid down at the Kaiserliche Werft (Imperial Shipyard) in Danzig on 12 July 1904. She was launched on 23 September 1905, and at the ceremony, she was christened by Heinrich Otto Ehlers, the Bürgermeister of the ship's namesake city. After completing fitting-out work, she was commissioned to begin sea trials on 1 December 1907. These were carried out with a temporary crew, and lasted until 6 April 1908. The ship then took most of the crew from the light cruiser Arcona, whose place she took in I Scouting Group, the reconnaissance force of the High Seas Fleet. She and the rest of I Scouting Group embarked on a voyage into the central Atlantic in July and August. The cruise was made in company with the battleship squadrons of the High Seas Fleet. Prince Heinrich had pressed for such a cruise the previous year, arguing that it would prepare the fleet for overseas operations and would break up the monotony of training in German waters, though tensions with Britain over the developing Anglo-German naval arms race were high. The fleet departed Kiel on 17 July, passed through the Kaiser Wilhelm Canal to the North Sea, and continued to the Atlantic. The fleet returned to Germany on 13 August. The autumn maneuvers followed from 27 August to 12 September. That year, Danzig was awarded the Kaiser's Schießpreis (Shooting Prize) for excellent shooting for the light cruisers of I Scouting Group.

In February 1909, I Scouting Group went on another training cruise in the Atlantic. The cruisers joined the High Seas Fleet for another Atlantic cruise in July and August. On the way back to Germany, the fleet stopped in Spithead, Britain, where it was received by the Royal Navy. Danzig won the Schießpreis again that year. Danzig was detached from I Scouting Group on 5 June 1910 and she was assigned to the naval artillery inspectorate, based in Sonderburg. In June, the ship came under the command of Korvettenkapitän (Corvette Captain) Hans Pfundheller. During this period, the torpedo boat S32 served as Danzig's tender. S32 accidentally collided with the torpedo boat S76 in the Kieler Förde on the night of 16–17 August, and Danzig came to their aid, picking up both of their crews. Danzig attempted to take S76 under tow, but her line failed and other vessels came to the torpedo boat's aid. The ships were unable to save S32 before she sank. Danzig was drydocked in her namesake city later that year for modifications and an extensive overhaul.

After returning to service in early 1911, Danzig joined the armored cruiser Prinz Adalbert for shooting practice held off the Faroe Islands in March. She joined the Training and Experimental Ships Unit on 2 April for exercises conducted in the northern North Sea, in the vicinity of the 60th parallel; during the maneuvers, the ships operated out of Ålesund, Norway. Danzig was present for the naval review held for Kaiser Wilhelm II on 5 September in the Bay of Kiel. Her annual overhaul lasted from 22 October to 2 December. In 1912, Danzig was recommissioned for service with the newly formed II Scouting Group, with the armored cruiser Blücher as its flagship. Danzig was drydocked for another overhaul in mid-December. The year 1913 saw Danzig assigned to what was now the Training Squadron, and the annual training routine culminated in large scale fleet maneuvers with the rest of the High Seas Fleet in August and September. She remained in the unit through early 1914, and she participated in training exercises in March and April. In late July, as tensions between the Central Powers (which included Germany) and the Triple Entente over the Assassination of Archduke Franz Ferdinand and ensuing July Crisis, Danzig was assigned to guard the Bay of Kiel against a possible Russian attack.

=== World War I ===
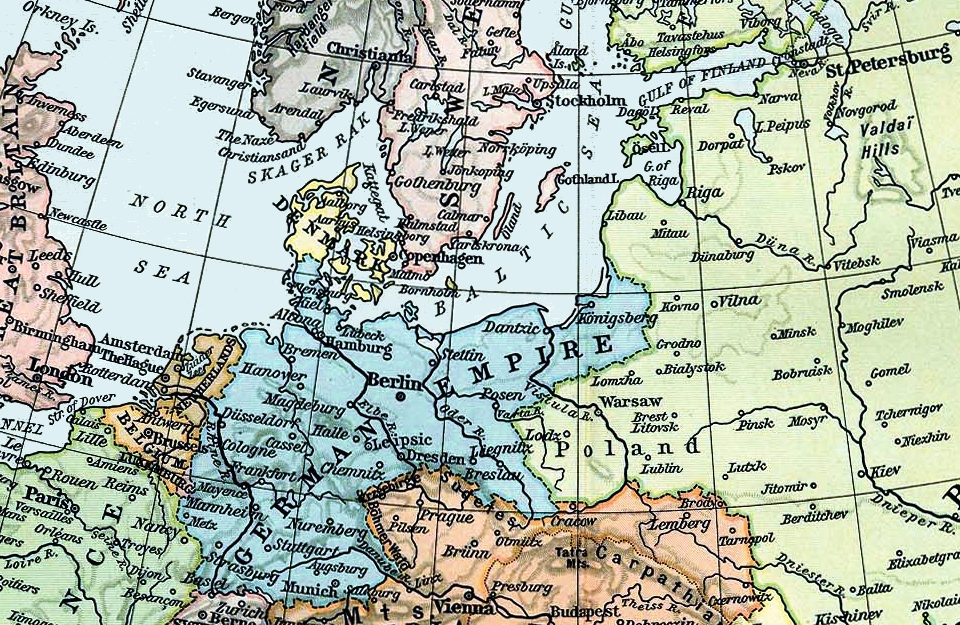
Map of the North and Baltic Seas in 1911

==== With the High Seas Fleet ====
Following the outbreak of World War I on 28 July, Danzig was assigned to III Scouting Group on 1 August, which was given the task of patrolling the German Bight. The unit was renumbered as IV Scouting Group on 25 August. The next day, Danzig and her sister München were temporarily sent to the Baltic Sea to assist in efforts to recover the light cruiser Magdeburg that day. Danzig was moored in Brunsbüttel with her sister-ship München, having passed back through the Kaiser Wilhelm Canal on the way back to join IV Scouting Group on the morning of 28 August 1914, when the British attacked the German patrol line in the Heligoland Bight. During the ensuing Battle of Heligoland Bight, Danzig and München were recalled and ordered to steam to the mouth of the Elbe and wait for further orders. Danzig reached the stricken cruiser Ariadne shortly before 15:00 and lowered boats to rescue survivors. Konteradmiral Franz von Hipper, the commander of I Scouting Group, issued an order for all cruisers to regroup on the approaching battlecruisers Von der Tann and Moltke, but Fregattenkapitän Reiß, Danzig's commander, refused, replying that he was "Rescuing people from Ariadne." Danzig rescued some 170 survivors from the ship.

Danzig, still part of IV Scouting Group, took part in the fleet advance on 3–4 November 1914 in support of the raid on Yarmouth by the battlecruisers of I Scouting Group. The Germans hoped to surprise detached elements of the numerically superior British Grand Fleet or lure them to be ambushed by the High Seas Fleet, but they failed to do either. She was also present as part of the screen of the High Seas Fleet during the operation on 15–16 December to cover the battlecruisers' raid on Scarborough, Hartlepool and Whitby. She saw no combat during the action; after reports that other cruisers in the fleet screen had encountered British warships on the morning of 16 December, Ingenohl broke off and withdrew to port. Danzig next took part in the fleet advance on 24 January 1915 to support I Scouting Group after it had been ambushed by the British 1st and 2nd Battlecruiser Squadrons during the Battle of Dogger Bank, though she again saw no action, as the battle had ended before the High Seas Fleet arrived late in the afternoon. Two further fleet advances followed on 29–30 March and 18–22 April, both of which ended without result.

==== Baltic operations and mine damage ====
On 7 May 1915, IV Scouting Group, which by then consisted of Danzig, München, Stettin, and Stuttgart, and twenty-one torpedo boats was sent into the Baltic Sea to support a major operation against Russian positions at Libau. The operation was commanded by Rear Admiral Hopman, the commander of the reconnaissance forces in the Baltic. IV Scouting Group was tasked with screening to the north to prevent any Russian naval forces from moving out of the Gulf of Finland undetected, while several armored cruisers and other warships bombarded the port. The Russians did attempt to intervene with a force of four cruisers: Admiral Makarov, Bayan, Oleg, and Bogatyr. The Russian ships briefly engaged München, but both sides were unsure of the others' strength, and so both disengaged. Shortly after the bombardment, Libau was captured by the advancing German army. On 8 May, Danzig joined the old pre-dreadnought battleships of IV Battle Squadron on a reconnaissance toward Gotland; the operation lasted until 10 May, but encountered no Russian forces. Danzig and the rest of IV Scouting Group were thereafter recalled to the High Seas Fleet. After rejoining the High Seas Fleet, Danzig joined the escort for a minelaying operation near the Dogger Bank, and at 09:18, she struck a British mine on her starboard side and was seriously damaged. Unable to steam under her own power, Danzig was taken under tow by her sister Berlin at 11:15 back to Helgoland, with München and seven torpedo boats escorting her. There, the tugboat Boreas took over the tow and brought Danzig to the AG Weser shipyard in Bremen for repairs. The damage to the ship was so severe that most of her crew was sent to man the cruiser Frauenlob on 1 June.

Danzig returned to active service on 13 November and ten days later, she was assigned to the naval forces in the Baltic. The next day, she took on a load of eighty mines at Kiel to carry them to Libau. While cruising off the southern tip of Gotland on 25 November, the ship ran into a Russian minefield and struck a mine at 01:58. The mine explosion tore off the ship's rudder, bent one of her propeller shafts, and holed the aft two watertight compartments, flooding them with water. Berlin was again sent to take Danzig under tow, which was effected at 10:30. A torpedo boat guided the ships back to port, initially to Neufahrwassar, which they reached on 26 November. Danzig was then brought to the Kaiserliche Werft in Danzig for repairs. The initial inspection provided an estimate of six months worth of repairs, so Danzig's crew was again reduced on 16 December so the men could be employed aboard other vessels, and again most of them went to Frauenlob. Danzig received temporary repairs at Danzig to allow her to be towed to Bremen, where permanent work would be carried out. The transfer was made on 27 January 1916, and she remained in drydock there until 12 July. After a brief working up period, Danzig rejoined IV Scouting Group on 4 August, which was still assigned to patrol duties in the German Bight. She was present with the fleet screen for the operation of 18–20 August, along with another such sweep into the North Sea toward the Dogger Bank in October. On 1 December, Danzig was transferred to II Scouting Group, though on 10 January 1917 she briefly joined IV Scouting Group to cover a minelaying operation between Helgoland and Norderney to strengthen an existing minefield. In May, KK Prinz Adalbert, the son of Wilhelm II, took command of the cruiser. On 11 June, Danzig was sent to the Baltic to serve as a target ship for other cruisers, torpedo boats, and U-boats.

==== Later operations ====
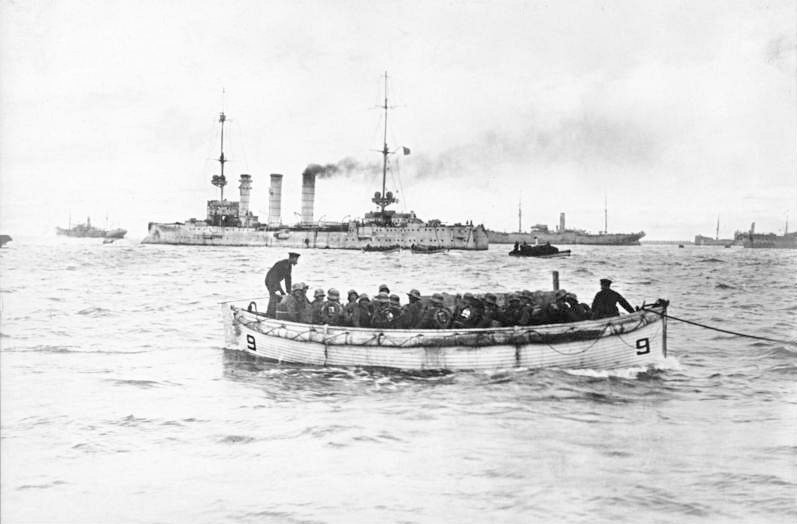
Danzig during Operation Albion

In early September 1917, following the German conquest of the Russian port of Riga, the German navy decided to eliminate the Russian naval forces that still held the Gulf of Riga in Operation Albion. The Admiralstab (the Navy High Command) planned the operation to seize the Baltic island of Ösel, and specifically the Russian gun batteries on the Sworbe Peninsula. On 18 September, the order was issued for a joint operation with the army to capture Ösel and Moon Islands; the primary naval component was to comprise the flagship, Moltke, along with III and IV Battle Squadrons of the High Seas Fleet. The invasion force amounted to approximately 24,600 officers and enlisted men. Danzig had by this time been transferred back to II Scouting Group, which was tasked with screening for the invasion force. Danzig's only significant action during the operation came on the 19th, when she and Königsberg and Nürnberg were sent to intercept two Russian torpedo boats reported to be in the area. The Germans could not locate the vessels, and broke off the operation.

Danzig was withdrawn from front line service in late 1917, and the navy planned to convert her into a seaplane tender along the lines of Stuttgart. The project came to nothing and the ship was instead allocated to the material reserve. She spent the following several months serving as a target ship for the U-boat school. Danzig was decommissioned on 25 March 1918 in her namesake city and Prinz Adalbert left the ship. She survived the end of the war, but she was not retained by the postwar Reichsmarine owing to the damage she had sustained in the two minings. She was instead stricken from the naval register on 5 November 1919. The ship was surrendered to the United Kingdom as the war prize R on 15 September 1920 to replace ships that had been scuttled at Scapa Flow. On 17 February 1921, she was sold to George Clarkson and broken up for scrap in Whitby between 1921 and 1928.
