= SMS Stuttgart =

Light cruiser of the German Imperial Navy

History

German Empire
- Name: Stuttgart
- Namesake: Stuttgart
- Laid down: 1 November 1905
- Launched: 22 September 1906
- Commissioned: 1 February 1908
- Decommissioned: 15 December 1916
- Stricken: 5 November 1919
- Fate: Surrendered to Britain, 1920, scrapped

General characteristics
- Class & type: Königsberg-class cruiser
- Displacement: Normal: 3,469 t (3,414 long tons); Full load: 4,002 t (3,939 long tons)
- Length: 115.3 m (378 ft)
- Beam: 13.2 m (43 ft)
- Draft: 5.29 m (17.4 ft)
- Installed power: 13,200 PS (9,700 kW); 11 × water-tube boilers
- Propulsion: 2 × screw propellers; 2 × triple-expansion engines
- Speed: 24.1 knots (44.6 km/h; 27.7 mph)
- Complement: 14 Officers; 308 Enlisted men
- Armament: 10 × 10.5 cm (4.1 in) SK L/40 guns; 8 × 5.2 cm (2 in) SK guns; 2 × 45 cm (17.7 in) torpedo tubes
- Armor: Deck: 80 mm (3.1 in); Conning tower: 100 mm (3.9 in)

SMS Stuttgart was a Königsberg-class light cruiser of the Kaiserliche Marine (Imperial Navy), named after the city of Stuttgart. She had three sister ships: Königsberg, Nürnberg, and Stettin. Stuttgart was laid down at the Imperial Dockyard in Danzig in 1905, launched in September 1906, and commissioned in February 1908. Like her sisters, Stettin was armed with a main battery of ten 10.5 cm (4.1 in) guns and a pair of 45 cm (18 in) torpedo tubes, and was capable of a top speed in excess of 25 knots (46 km/h; 29 mph).

Stuttgart was used as a gunnery training ship from her commissioning to the outbreak of World War I in August 1914, when she was mobilized into the reconnaissance forces of the High Seas Fleet. There, she saw action at the Battle of Jutland, where she engaged the British cruiser HMS Dublin. Stuttgart was not damaged during the battle. She was converted into a seaplane tender in 1918, and after the end of the war, was surrendered to Britain as a war prize in 1920 and subsequently broken up for scrap.

== Design ==
The Königsberg-class ships were designed to serve both as fleet scouts in home waters and in Germany's colonial empire. This was a result of budgetary constraints that prevented the Kaiserliche Marine (Imperial Navy) from building more specialized cruisers suitable for both roles. The Königsberg class was an iterative development of the preceding Bremen class. All four members of the class were intended to be identical, but after the initial vessel was begun, the design staff incorporated lessons from the Russo-Japanese War. These included internal rearrangements and a lengthening of the hull.

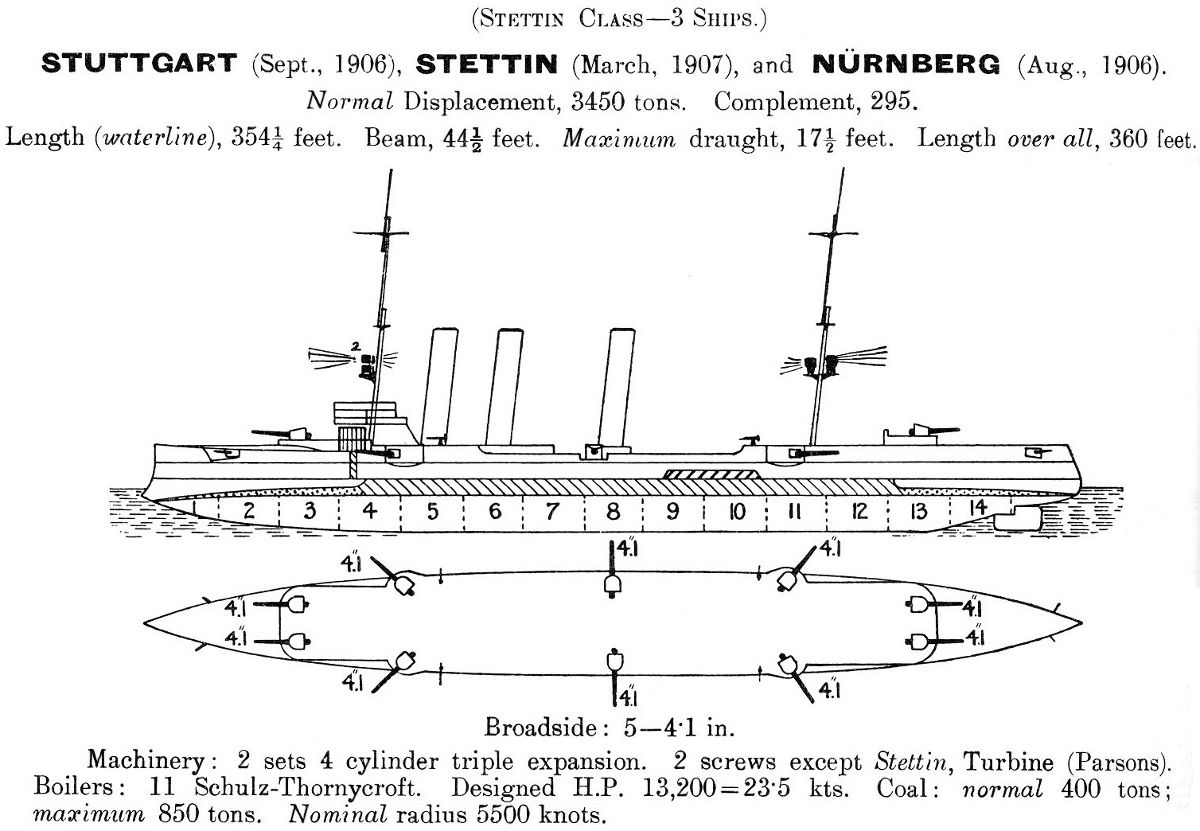
Plan and profile drawing of the Königsberg class (Note: The diagram mistakenly refers to the class as the Stettin class and does not include Königsberg)

Stuttgart was 115.3 meters (378 ft) long overall and had a beam of 13.2 m (43 ft) and a draft of 5.29 m (17.4 ft) forward. She displaced 3,469 t (3,414 long tons; 3,824 short tons) normally and up to 4,002 t (3,939 long tons; 4,411 short tons) at full load. The ship had a minimal superstructure, which consisted of a small conning tower and bridge structure. Her hull had a raised forecastle and quarterdeck, along with a pronounced ram bow. She was fitted with two pole masts. Stuttgart had a crew of 14 officers and 308 enlisted men.

Her propulsion system consisted of two 3-cylinder triple-expansion steam engines that drove a pair of screw propellers. Steam was provided by eleven coal-fired Marine-type water-tube boilers that were vented through three funnels. The ship's propulsion system was rated to produce 13,200 metric horsepower (9,700 kW) for a top speed of 23 knots (43 km/h; 26 mph), though she exceeded these figures in service. Normal coal storage amounted to 400 t (390 long tons; 440 short tons). At a more economical pace of 12 knots (22 km/h; 14 mph), the ship had a range of approximately 5,750 nautical miles (10,650 km; 6,620 mi).

The ship was armed with a main battery of ten 10.5 cm (4.1 in) SK L/40 guns in single pedestal mounts. Two were placed side by side forward on the forecastle; six were located on the broadside, three on either side; and two were side by side aft. The guns had a maximum elevation of 30 degrees, which allowed them to engage targets out to 12,700 m (41,700 ft). They were supplied with 1,500 rounds of ammunition, for 150 shells per gun. The ship was also equipped with eight 5.2 cm (2 in) SK guns with 4,000 rounds of ammunition. She was also equipped with a pair of 45 cm (17.7 in) torpedo tubes with five torpedoes submerged in the hull on the broadside.

The ship was protected by a curved armor deck that was 80 mm (3.1 in) thick amidships. The deck sloped downward at the sides, with a thickness of 45 mm (1.8 in), to provide protection against enemy fire. The conning tower sides were 100 mm (3.9 in) thick. Her main battery guns were fitted with 50 mm (2 in) thick gun shields.

== Service history ==
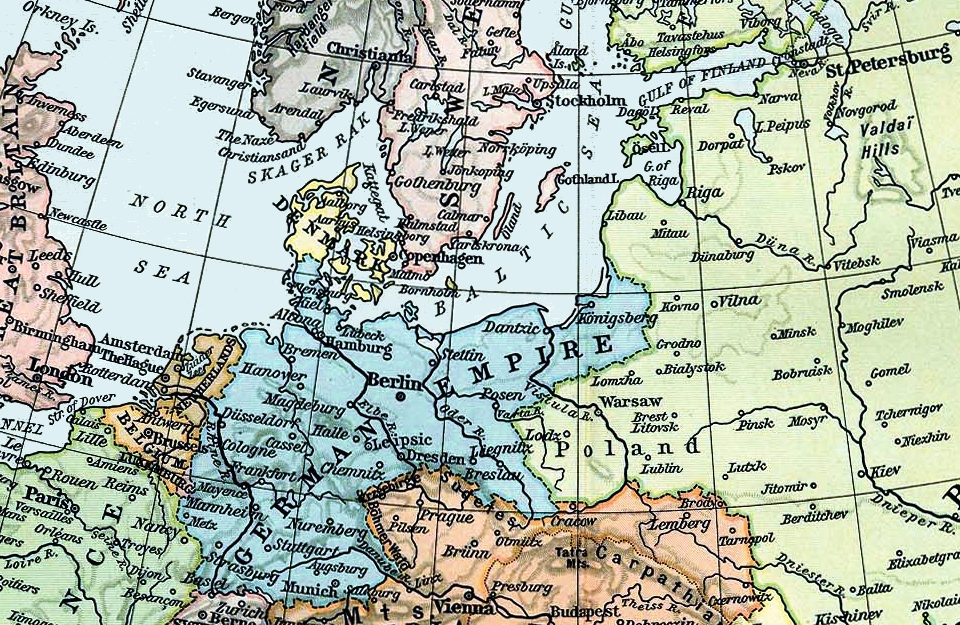
Map of the North and Baltic Seas in 1911

Stuttgart was ordered under the contract name "O", (Note: German warships were ordered under provisional names. Additions to the fleet were given a single letter; ships intended to replace older or lost vessels were ordered as "Ersatz (name of the ship to be replaced)".) the last cruiser to be authorized by the 1900 Naval Law. She was laid down at the Kaiserliche Werft (Imperial Dockyard) in Danzig on 1 November 1905. She was launched on 22 September 1906, when she was christened by Heinrich von Gauß, the Oberbürgermeister (mayor) of the ship's namesake city. Fitting-out work then commenced. She was commissioned into service on 1 February 1908 to begin sea trials, which lasted until 9 April. Shortages of officers and crewmen led to the ship's decommissioning shortly thereafter. She did not remain laid up for long, however; Admiral Alfred von Tirpitz, the State Secretary for the Reichsmarineamt (RMA—Imperial Naval Office) wanted to use modern ships for training purposes, and he requested that Stuttgart be recommissioned to serve as a gunnery training ship. She was duly recommissioned on 16 February 1909 to replace the older cruiser Nymphe in that role.

After entering service with the gunnery school, Stuttgart was based in Sonderburg. Her training activities were generally carried out in the Baltic Sea. During the annual fleet maneuvers in August and September 1909, she was temporarily assigned to III Scouting Group, the cruiser screen for the Reserve Fleet. She thereafter resumed training duties. From 1 April to 1 June 1910, she cruised in the North Sea in company with the armored cruiser Prinz Adalbert and visited the Faroe Islands; during the voyage, the ships conducted shooting practice. She was present for a naval review held in Danzig Bay on 28 August for Kaiser Wilhelm II, and she again participated in the autumn fleet exercises that followed immediately thereafter. The year 1911 saw little activity beyond routine gunnery training, apart from the autumn maneuvers in August and September, which included a naval review held in Kiel to mark the visit of the Austro-Hungarian crown prince, Franz Ferdinand, on 5 September.

A particularly cold winter in February 1912 led to Stuttgart being employed as an ice breaker to assist merchant vessels in the Baltic. On 9 February, she cleared a path in the pack ice from Sonderburg to Alsen. In July, she joined the Scouting Unit for a cruise in the Baltic to visit several ports in the region, which lasted into August. For the autumn fleet maneuvers, she was assigned to II Scouting Group. Another naval review for the kaiser followed on 19 September in the German Bight. The first half of 1916 passed similarly uneventfully for Stuttgart until 1 June, when she was sent with the pre-dreadnought battleship Wettin and the light cruiser Augsburg to assist the armored cruiser Blücher, which had run aground in the Great Belt. The work lasted until 3 June. Stuttgart again took part in the autumn fleet maneuvers, which lasted from 26 August to 12 September. Her last period of activity with the rest of the active fleet took place in March 1914 for a cruise in the North Sea.

=== World War I ===
At the outbreak of World War I in late July 1914, Stuttgart was in the shipyard in Danzig; she left the harbor on 6 August and arrived in Wilhelmshaven the following day. There, she was assigned to III Scouting Group, which was soon re-designated as IV Scouting Group. The cruisers of IV Scouting Group were tasked with patrol duties in the Heligoland Bight. The cruisers were divided with the torpedo boat flotillas, and assigned to rotate through nightly patrols into the North Sea. As part of this operation, Stuttgart conducted a patrol on the night of 15 August with Cöln and I and II Torpedo-boat Flotillas. The ships swept toward Horns Reef but returned to port without incident. On 25–26 August, Stuttgart led a mine-laying operation in the North Sea, escorting the mine-layin cruiser Albatross along with several torpedo boats. Six British fishing boats were later sunk by this minefield.

IV Scouting Group next shifted to operations with the rest of the High Seas Fleet. The first saw Stuttgart and the other cruisers serve in the cruiser screen for the main body of the High Seas Fleet, which provided distant support to the battlecruisers of I Scouting Group during their raid on Yarmouth on 3–4 November. Stuttgart briefly moved to the Baltic from 8 to 17 November, after which she resumed her role in the fleet's cruiser screen for the next operation against the British coast. This took place on 15–16 December, which again saw the battlecruisers of Rear Admiral Franz von Hipper's I Scouting Group bombarded Scarborough, Hartlepool, and Whitby. Following reports of British destroyers from the German screen, Admiral von Ingenohl ordered the High Seas Fleet to turn to port and head for Germany. At 06:59, Stuttgart, the armored cruiser Roon, and the light cruiser Hamburg encountered Commander Loftus William Jones' destroyers. Jones shadowed the Germans until 07:40, at which point Stuttgart and Hamburg were detached to sink their pursuers. At 08:02, however, Roon signaled the two light cruisers and ordered them to abandon the pursuit and retreat along with the rest of the High Seas Fleet.

Stuttgart next went into dry dock at the Kaiserliche Werft in Wilhelmshaven for an overhaul that lasted from 25 February to 12 March 1915. She thereafter re-joined IV Scouting Group. She covered further minelaying operations in the North Sea on 17–18 and 21–22 April. On 7 May 1915, IV Scouting Group, which by then consisted of Stuttgart, Stettin, the light cruisers München, and Danzig, and twenty-one torpedo boats was sent into the Baltic Sea to support a major operation against Russian positions at Libau. The operation was commanded by Rear Admiral Hopman, the commander of the reconnaissance forces in the Baltic. IV Scouting Group was tasked with screening to the north to prevent any Russian naval forces from moving out of the Gulf of Finland undetected, while several armored cruisers and other warships bombarded the port. The Russians did attempt to intervene with a force of four cruisers: Admiral Makarov, Bayan, Oleg, and Bogatyr. The Russian ships briefly engaged München, but both sides were unsure of the others' strength, and so both disengaged. Shortly after the bombardment, Libau was captured by the advancing German army, and Stuttgart and the rest of IV Scouting Group were recalled to the High Seas Fleet by 9 May.

After returning to the fleet, Stuttgart and the rest of IV Scouting Group covered the battleships during sorties on 17–18 and 25–26 May, both times to cover minelaying operations carried out by II Scouting Group. During this period, Stuttgart carried a seaplane for the first time, but the aircraft was not used during the operations. Another fleet sweep into the North Sea took place on 29–30 May, which encountered no British vessels. IV Scouting Group—which now consisted of Stuttgart, Stettin, and the light cruisers Berlin and Kolberg—carried out a patrol into the Hoofden on 1–2 July, but again, no British ships were seen. The fleet sortied twice more in late 1915; on 11–12 September and 23–24 October. The day after the latter operation, Stuttgart was sent back to the Baltic to reinforce the cruiser force there. British submarines had become increasingly active in the area and the Germans had incurred a series of losses that needed to be replaced. The ship saw no significant operations during this period, however, and she spent much of it in dry-dock for an overhaul in Wilhelmshaven that lasted from 21 November to 14 December. On 30 January 1916, Stuttgart was recalled to IV Scouting Group. On 4 March, Stuttgart participated in a fleet operation to cover the return of the commerce raider Möwe, which had completed its first operation. The fleet sortied the following day for another sweep for British warships that ended without results on 7 March. On 25 March, the fleet went to sea again in an unsuccessful attempt to destroy British seaplane carriers that had raided the German airbase at Tondern. Stuttgart and the rest of the High Seas Fleet went to sea twice in April, the first on the 21st and 22nd, and the second on the 24th and 25th; the latter to cover the battlecruisers during the bombardment of Yarmouth and Lowestoft.

==== Battle of Jutland ====
Maps showing the maneuvers of the British (blue) and German (red) fleets on 30–31 May 1916

Stuttgart was assigned to IV Scouting Group during the Battle of Jutland on 31 May – 1 June 1916. IV Scouting Group, under the command of Commodore Ludwig von Reuter, departed Wilhelmshaven at 03:30 on 31 May, along with the rest of the fleet. Tasked with screening for the fleet, Stuttgart and the torpedo boat V71 were positioned at the rear of the fleet, astern of II Battle Squadron. Stuttgart and IV Scouting Group were not heavily engaged during the early phases of the battle, but around 21:30, they encountered the British 3rd Light Cruiser Squadron (3rd LCS). Reuter's ships were leading the High Seas Fleet south, away from the deployed Grand Fleet. Due to the long range and poor visibility, only München and Stettin were able to engage the British cruisers. Stuttgart was the fourth ship in the line, and her gunners could only make out one British ship in the haze. Since that ship was already being engaged by the other German cruisers, Stuttgart held her fire. Reuter turned his ships hard to starboard, in order to draw the British closer to the capital ships of the German fleet, but the 3rd LCS refused to take the bait and disengaged.

During the ferocious night fighting that occurred as the High Seas Fleet forced its way through the British rear, IV Scouting Group encountered the 2nd Light Cruiser Squadron at close range in the darkness. As the two squadrons closed on each other, the Germans illuminated HMS Southampton and HMS Dublin and concentrated their fire on the two ships. Stuttgart and Elbing fired on Dublin. During this period, Dublin was hit by eight shells, probably all from Stuttgart, though these hits did not do serious damage. The two British ships were badly damaged and set on fire and forced to retreat, while the Germans also fell back in an attempt to bring the British closer to the battlecruisers Moltke and Seydlitz. In the melee, the cruiser Frauenlob was hit and sunk by a torpedo launched by Southampton; this forced Stuttgart to haul out of line to starboard. She then lost contact with the rest of IV Scouting Group, so she fell in with I Battle Squadron. She was present during a later encounter with British light forces around midnight. She remained concealed in the darkness and observed I Battle Squadron dreadnoughts hammering several British destroyers. The British meanwhile launched torpedoes at the German line, which forced it to turn away. Stuttgart had to thread her way in between the battleships Nassau and Posen in the darkness.

By 02:30, Stuttgart was steaming at the head of the German line, ahead of Westfalen, the leading battleship. She led I Battle Squadron back to port, and later assisted III Battle Squadron and the fleet flagship, Friedrich der Grosse. In the course of the battle, Stuttgart had fired 64 rounds, the least of all of the German cruisers in the battle. She emerged from the battle unscathed, unlike many of the other German cruisers.

==== Subsequent operations and conversion ====
Stuttgart next went to sea with the rest of the fleet on 19–20 August, which resulted in the abortive action of 19 August 1916, which saw the British and German fleets initially attempt to engage each other, but both sides disengaged, the British after losing a cruiser to a U-boat and the Germans after failing to locate the detached Harwich Force. Another sortie followed on 18–20 October, which again failed to locate any British vessels. The operation was called off after München was torpedoed by a British submarine. On 1 December, the units of the High Seas Fleet were reorganized, and many of the older ships, which were inadequately protected against torpedo or mine damage, were withdrawn so their crews could be used elsewhere. Stuttgart was decommissioned as part of this restructuring on 15 December, and her crew were used to man the new cruiser Emden.

By this time, it had become increasingly clear that the High Seas Fleet needed seaplane carriers that could accompany it to provide fast aerial reconnaissance. The Germans had initially focused their efforts on zeppelins, owing to the state of technology before the start of the war. In late 1914, they had converted a number of steamships into seaplane tenders, but these were too slow to operate with the fleet. The commanders of the High Seas Fleet made increasing demands for aircraft-carrying ships over the course of the war, and the naval command discussed converting a number of the older cruisers that had been decommissioned, including Stuttgart, but the RMA refused to agree to the conversions. Eventually, on 20 January 1918, the naval command was finally able to convince the RMA that Stuttgart and Stettin should be converted into fast seaplane tenders. The order to convert the vessels was issued on 24 January, but the question of the nature of the conversion had not yet been settled: should they be lightly armed seaplane tenders or should they retain some of their original armament as aircraft cruisers? The latter option was chosen for the conversion.

Conversion work started in February 1918, and the naval command created the position "Commander of the Fleet's Aviators", which was given to Stuttgart's captain, effective 1 February. The work was done at the Kaiserliche Werft in Wilhelmshaven, and was completed in May. As a seaplane tender, her forward and rear 10.5 cm guns, and the two rearmost broadside guns were removed, leaving only four broadside guns remaining. Two 8.8 cm SK L/45 anti-aircraft guns were installed forward; she retained her submerged torpedo tubes. Two large hangars were installed aft of the funnels, with space for two seaplanes; a third seaplane was carried on top of the hangars. Stuttgart was recommissioned on 16 May, and she embarked her first aircraft eleven days later. The ship carried out initial training in the Baltic, and by late July, she began operations in the German Bight to cover the minesweepers clearing paths in the minefields there.

Since Stuttgart could carry only three aircraft, a number which was deemed insufficient to support the entire High Seas Fleet, plans were drawn up to convert Roon into a seaplane carrier as well, but the Kaiserliche Werft in Wilhelmshaven informed the naval command that work could not begin until early 1919. Throughout the discussions about the Roon conversion, elements of the naval command argued that a true aircraft carrier for wheeled aircraft would be a superior option, leading to the decision to convert the unfinished passenger liner Ausonia into such a vessel, though like with Roon, the project was not completed. Stuttgart survived the war, and was decommissioned in Kiel on 17 December 1918. She was specified among the list of vessels to be surrendered to the Allied powers as a war prize under the terms of the Treaty of Versailles. She was stricken from the naval register on 5 November 1919. On 14 July 1920, Stuttgart left Germany in company with the cruisers Pillau, Strassburg, and Königsberg and four torpedo boats, bound for Cherbourg, France, where she was surrendered to the Allies by 20 July. She was surrendered to the United Kingdom on 20 July 1920, as the war prize "S". On 22 October, she was sold for scrap to the Channel Shipbreaking Company of Teignmouth, and was subsequently broken up at their facility at Dartmouth by 1922.
