= Bremen-class cruiser =

Type of German Navy light cruiser in the early 1900s

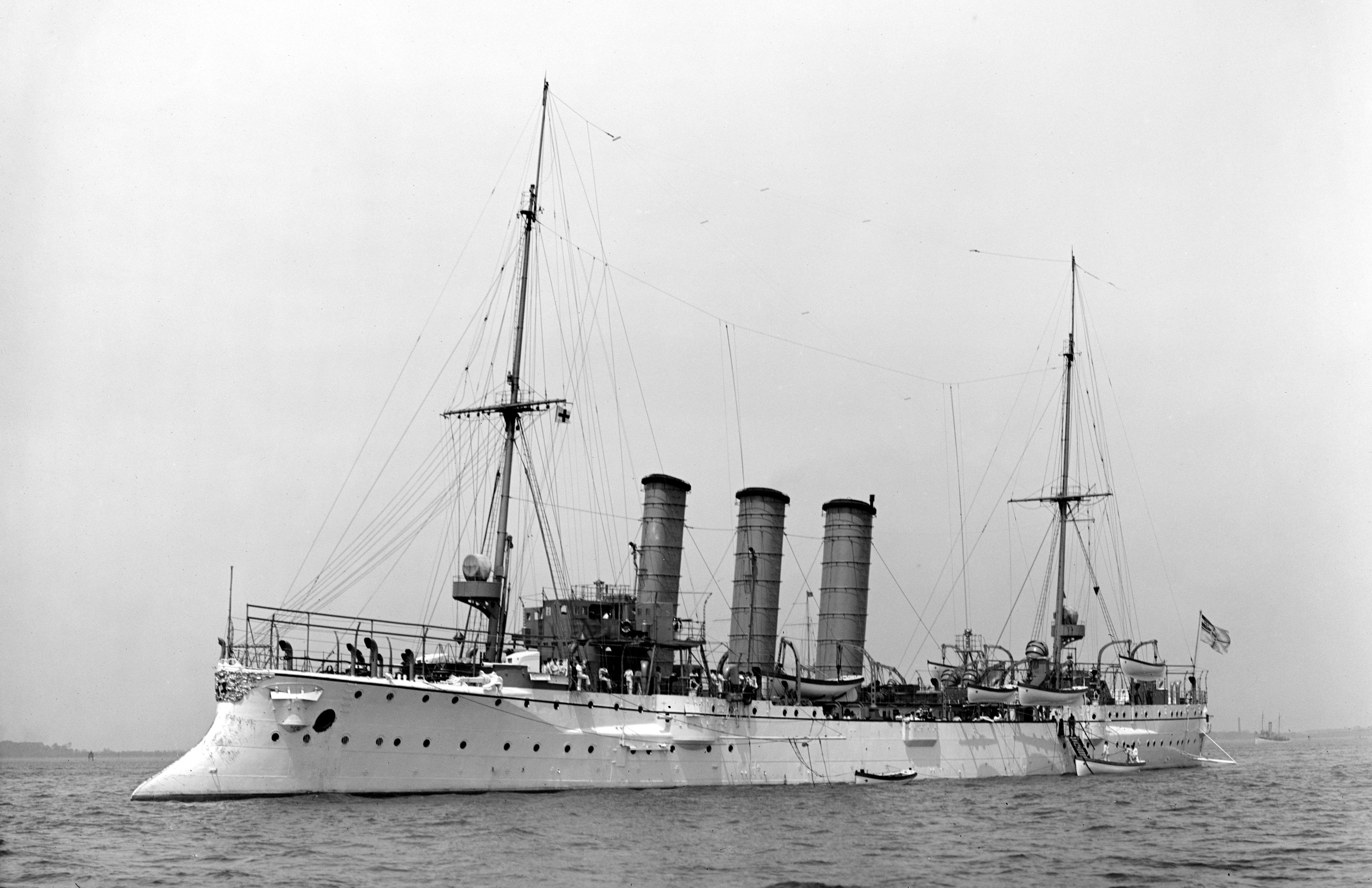
- SMS Bremen in 1907

Class overview
- Builders: AG Weser (3); AG Vulcan Stettin (2); Kaiserliche Werft Danzig (2)
- Operators: Imperial German Navy; Reichsmarine; Kriegsmarine
- Preceded by: Gazelle class
- Succeeded by: Königsberg class
- In commission: 1904–1936
- Completed: 7
- Lost: 4
- Scrapped: 3

General characteristics
- Type: Light cruiser
- Displacement: Normal: 3,278 t (3,226 long tons); Full load: 3,797 t (3,737 long tons)
- Length: Length overall: 111.1 meters (364 ft 6 in)
- Beam: 13.3 m (43 ft 8 in)
- Draft: 5.53 m (18 ft 2 in)
- Installed power: 10 × water-tube boilers; 10,000 PS (9,900 ihp)
- Propulsion: 2 × screw propellers; 2 × triple-expansion engines
- Speed: 22 knots (41 km/h; 25 mph)
- Range: 4,270 nmi (7,910 km; 4,910 mi) at 12 knots (22 km/h; 14 mph)
- Complement: 14 officers; 274 enlisted men
- Armament: 10 × 10.5 cm (4.1 in) SK L/40 guns; 10 × 3.7 cm (1.5 in) Maxim guns; 2 × 45 cm (17.7 in) torpedo tubes
- Armor: Deck: 80 mm (3.1 in)

The Bremen class was a group of seven light cruisers built for the Imperial German Navy in the early 1900s. The seven ships, Bremen, Hamburg, Berlin, Lübeck, München, Leipzig, and Danzig, were an improvement upon the previous Gazelle class. They were significantly larger than the earlier class, and were faster and better armored. Like the Gazelles, they were armed with a main battery of ten 10.5 cm SK L/40 guns and a pair of torpedo tubes.

The ships of the Bremen class served in a variety of roles, from overseas cruiser to fleet scout to training ship. Bremen and Leipzig were deployed to the American and Asian stations, respectively, while the other five ships remained in German waters with the High Seas Fleet. At the outbreak of World War I in August 1914, Leipzig was in the Pacific Ocean in the East Asia Squadron; she saw action at the Battle of Coronel in November and was sunk a month later at the Battle of the Falkland Islands. Bremen was sunk by a Russian mine in December 1915, but the other five ships of the class survived the war.

Three of the surviving ships, Lübeck, München, and Danzig, were seized by Britain as war prizes after the end of the war and sold for scrapping. The other two ships, Hamburg and Berlin, were used as training cruisers through the 1920s. They were converted into barracks ships in the mid-1930s, a role they filled for a decade; in 1944, Hamburg was sunk by British bombers and later broken up for scrap, while Berlin was scuttled in deep water after the end of World War II to dispose of a load of chemical weapons.

== Design ==
Medusa of the Gazelle class, which provided the basis for the Bremen design

The 1898 Naval Law authorized the construction of thirty new light cruisers by 1904, with two cruisers to be built per year; an amendment passed in 1900 increased that number to three per annum. By this time, Admiral Alfred von Tirpitz had become the head of the Reichsmarineamt (RMA—Imperial Naval Office), and he favored a strategy of concentrating the German fleet in home waters, rather than dispersing numerous vessels on foreign stations.

The Gazelle-class cruisers filled the requirements for the first ten vessels projected by the 1898 Naval Law. The design for the Bremen class was an incremental improvement over the Gazelle class, the improvements chiefly being in size and speed. To accommodate the more powerful propulsion system, a third funnel was added. The armor deck was also thickened significantly. The German Navy had begun experimenting with steam turbines aboard small vessels in 1901. Toward the end of the year, Tirpitz instructed the construction department to study the possibility of fitting one of the new cruisers with turbines, since they promised to provide greater power for the same weight. In addition, the quality of turbine engines could be compared with otherwise identical vessels that were fitted with triple-expansion steam engines. Kaiser Wilhelm II approved the decision to equip the fourth member of the new class, Lübeck, with the new engines on 20 January 1903.

The Bremen class marked a change in German cruiser naming conventions; Kaiser Wilhelm II authorized the use of city names for the new ships, three of which were major ports from the old Hanseatic League, along with Danzig, two major cities in Bavaria and Saxony, along with the German capital. The Bremen class was followed by the Königsberg class, which was very similar to the Bremens, including the same armament. And like the Bremens, one ship of the class, Stettin, was equipped with turbines while the others retained triple-expansion machinery.

=== General characteristics ===
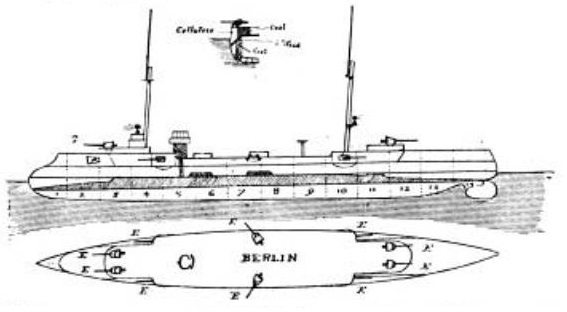
Plan and profile of the Bremen class

The Bremen-class ships were 110.6 meters (362 ft 10 in) long at the waterline and 111.1 m (364 ft 6 in) long overall. They had a beam of 13.3 m (43 ft 8 in) and a draft of 5.28 to 5.68 m (17 ft 4 in to 18 ft 8 in) forward. They displaced 3,278 metric tons (3,226 long tons) as designed and between 3,652 to 3,816 t (3,594 to 3,756 long tons; 4,026 to 4,206 short tons) at full load. The ships' hulls had flush decks and a pronounced ram bow. They were constructed with transverse and longitudinal steel frames, and incorporated twelve watertight compartments. The hulls also had a double bottom that ran for 56 percent of the length of the hull.

All seven ships were good sea boats, but they were crank and rolled up to twenty degrees. They were also very wet at high speeds and suffered from a slight weather helm. Nevertheless, the ships turned tightly and were very maneuverable. In a hard turn, their speed fell up to 35 percent. They had a transverse metacentric height of 0.58 to 0.61 m (23 to 24 in). The ships had a standard crew of fourteen officers and between 274 and 287 enlisted men, though later in their careers, these figures increased to 19 and 330, respectively. The Bremen-class ships carried a number of smaller boats, including one picket boat, one pinnace, two cutters, two yawls, and one dinghy.

=== Machinery ===
With the exception of Lübeck, the ships' propulsion system consisted of two triple-expansion steam engines, which drove a pair of screw propellers. Lübeck was instead fitted with a pair of Parsons steam turbines manufactured by Brown, Boveri & Co. that drove four screws. All seven ships were fitted with ten coal-fired Marine-type water-tube boilers, which were trunked into three funnels amidships. Bremen and Hamburg had three generators that produced a total output of 111 kilowatts at 110 volts; the rest of the ships had two generators rated at 90 kilowatts at the same voltage.

The triple-expansion engines were designed to give 10,000 metric horsepower (9,900 ihp) for a top speed of 22 knots (41 km/h; 25 mph), while Lübeck's turbines were rated at 11,343 metric horsepower (11,188 shp) and a maximum speed of 22.5 knots (41.7 km/h; 25.9 mph), though all seven ships exceeded these speeds on trials. The ships carried up to 860 tonnes (850 long tons) of coal, which gave the first three ships a range of 4,270 nautical miles (7,910 km; 4,910 mi) at 12 knots (22 km/h; 14 mph); Lübeck's less efficient turbine engines cut her cruising radius to 3,800 nmi (7,000 km; 4,400 mi), while the last three ships of the class had a longer range, at 4,690 nmi (8,690 km; 5,400 mi).

=== Armament and armor ===
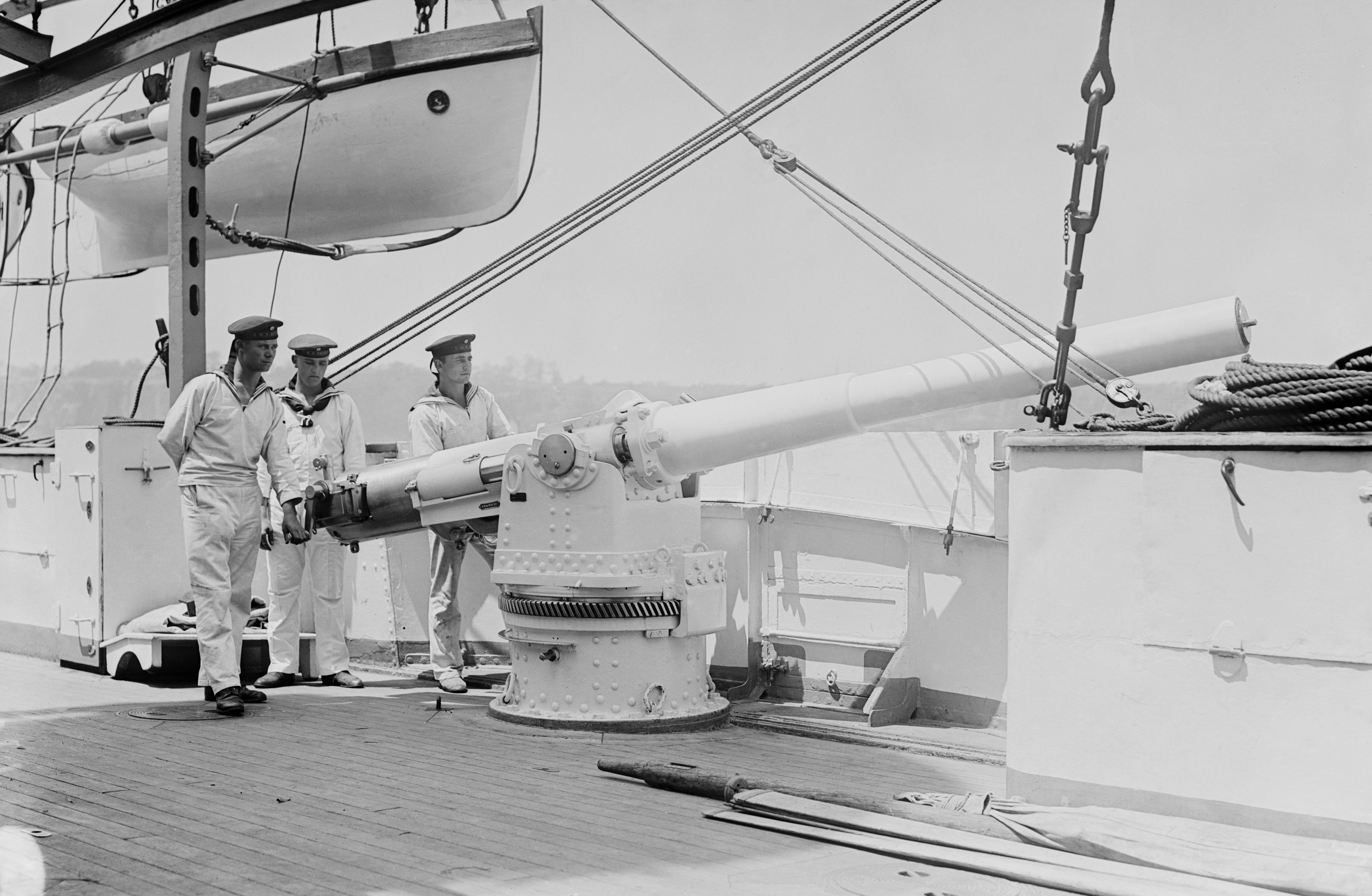
10.5 cm gun, without its gun shield, on board Bremen

The ships of the class were armed with ten 10.5 cm (4.1 in) SK L/40 guns in single mounts. Two were placed side by side forward on the forecastle, six were located amidships, three on either side, and two were placed side by side aft. The guns could engage targets out to 12,200 m (40,026 ft 3 in). For defense against torpedo boats, they were armed with ten 3.7 cm (1.5 in) Maxim guns. They were supplied with 1,500 rounds of ammunition, for 150 shells per gun. All seven ships were also equipped with two 45 cm (17.7 in) torpedo tubes with five torpedoes. These tubes were submerged in the hull on the broadside.

Later in their careers, Bremen and Lübeck had two 15 cm SK L/45 guns installed in place of the two forward and two rear 10.5 cm guns. They retained the six broadside 10.5 cm guns. Lübeck later had a pair of 50 cm (19.7 in) torpedo tubes installed in deck mounts, with four torpedoes.

Armor protection for the members of the class consisted of two layers of steel with one layer of Krupp armor. The ships were protected by an armored deck that was up to 80 millimeters (3.1 in) thick. Sloped armor 50 mm (2 in) thick gave some measure of vertical protection, coupled with the coal bunkers. The conning tower had 100 mm (3.9 in) thick sides and a 20 mm (0.79 in) thick roof. The ships' guns were protected by 50 mm thick gun shields.

== Construction ==
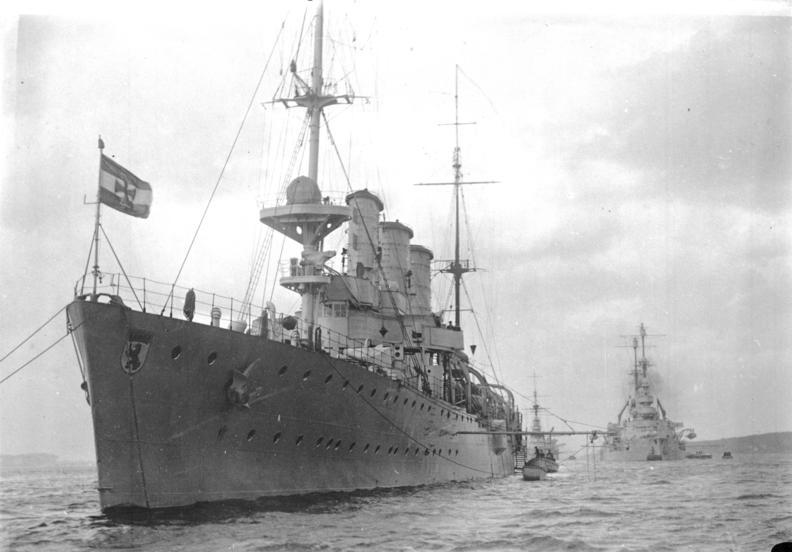
Berlin after her modernization in 1921–1923

Construction data
Name	Builder	Laid down	Launched	Commissioned
Bremen	AG Weser, Bremen	1902	9 July 1903	19 May 1904
Hamburg	AG Vulcan, Stettin	1902	25 July 1903	8 March 1904
Berlin	Kaiserliche Werft Danzig	1902	22 September 1903	4 April 1905
Lübeck	AG Vulcan, Stettin	1903	26 March 1904	26 April 1905
München	AG Weser, Bremen	1903	30 April 1904	10 January 1905
Leipzig	AG Weser, Bremen	1904	21 March 1905	20 April 1906
Danzig	Kaiserliche Werft Danzig	1904	23 September 1905	1 December 1907

== Service history ==
The ships of the Bremen class served in a variety of roles throughout their careers. Bremen and Leipzig served abroad from 1905 to 1914; the former returned to Germany shortly before the outbreak of World War I, and the latter remained with the East Asia Squadron. Hamburg, Berlin, Lübeck, and Danzig served in the reconnaissance forces of the High Seas Fleet after they entered service. München meanwhile was used as a torpedo test ship during her pre-war service. All seven of the ships saw action during the First World War, though only Bremen and Leipzig were lost during the conflict.

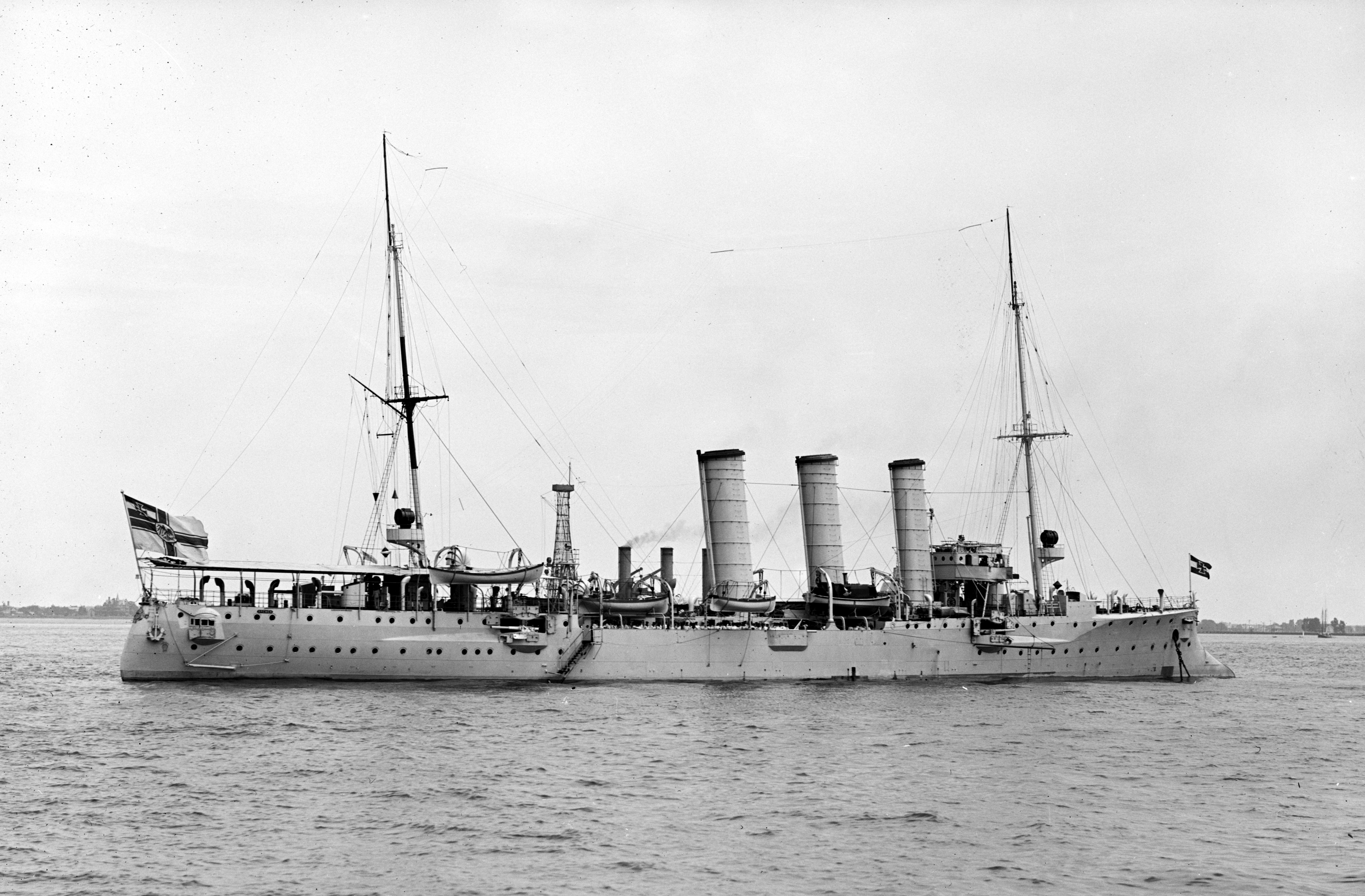
Bremen visiting the United States in 1912

Danzig was present during the Battle of Heligoland Bight in August 1914, but did not directly engage the British ships. She did, however, rescue survivors from the sinking cruiser Ariadne. Hamburg was present for the raid on Scarborough, Hartlepool and Whitby in December 1914, where she briefly encountered—but did not engage—British light forces. Only one ship, München, saw action at the Battle of Jutland on 31 May and 1 June 1916, where she was hit by five medium-caliber shells and moderately damaged. Three of the ships, Bremen, Lübeck, and Danzig, saw action against Imperial Russian forces in the Baltic Sea during the war, including during the assault on Libau and the Battle of the Gulf of Riga in 1915 and during Operation Albion in 1917. Bremen struck Russian mines in December 1915 and sank with the majority of her crew going down with her. Leipzig, still overseas at the start of the war, saw action at the Battles of Coronel and Falkland Islands in late 1914. At the former, she engaged the British cruiser HMS Glasgow, and at the latter, was sunk by Glasgow and HMS Cornwall.

Berlin was withdrawn from service in 1916 and disarmed. München was badly damaged by a British mine in October 1916, and thereafter decommissioned for use as a barracks ship. Hamburg was also used as barracks ship later in the war, and Lübeck became a training ship in 1917. Danzig was the last ship to leave active service, in late 1917. Of the five surviving ships, Berlin and Hamburg were retained by the newly reorganized Reichsmarine as training ships. The remaining three, Lübeck, München, and Danzig, were surrendered as war prizes to the United Kingdom, which sold them for scrapping in the early 1920s. Hamburg and Berlin soldiered on as training cruisers into the late 1920s and early 1930s; by the mid-1930s, they had again been converted into floating barracks. Hamburg was sunk by British bombers in 1944, and later raised and broken up for scrap in 1949. Berlin survived World War II and was loaded with chemical weapons and scuttled in the Skaggerak after the war to dispose of the munitions.
