= SMS Ariadne =

Light cruiser of the German Imperial Navy

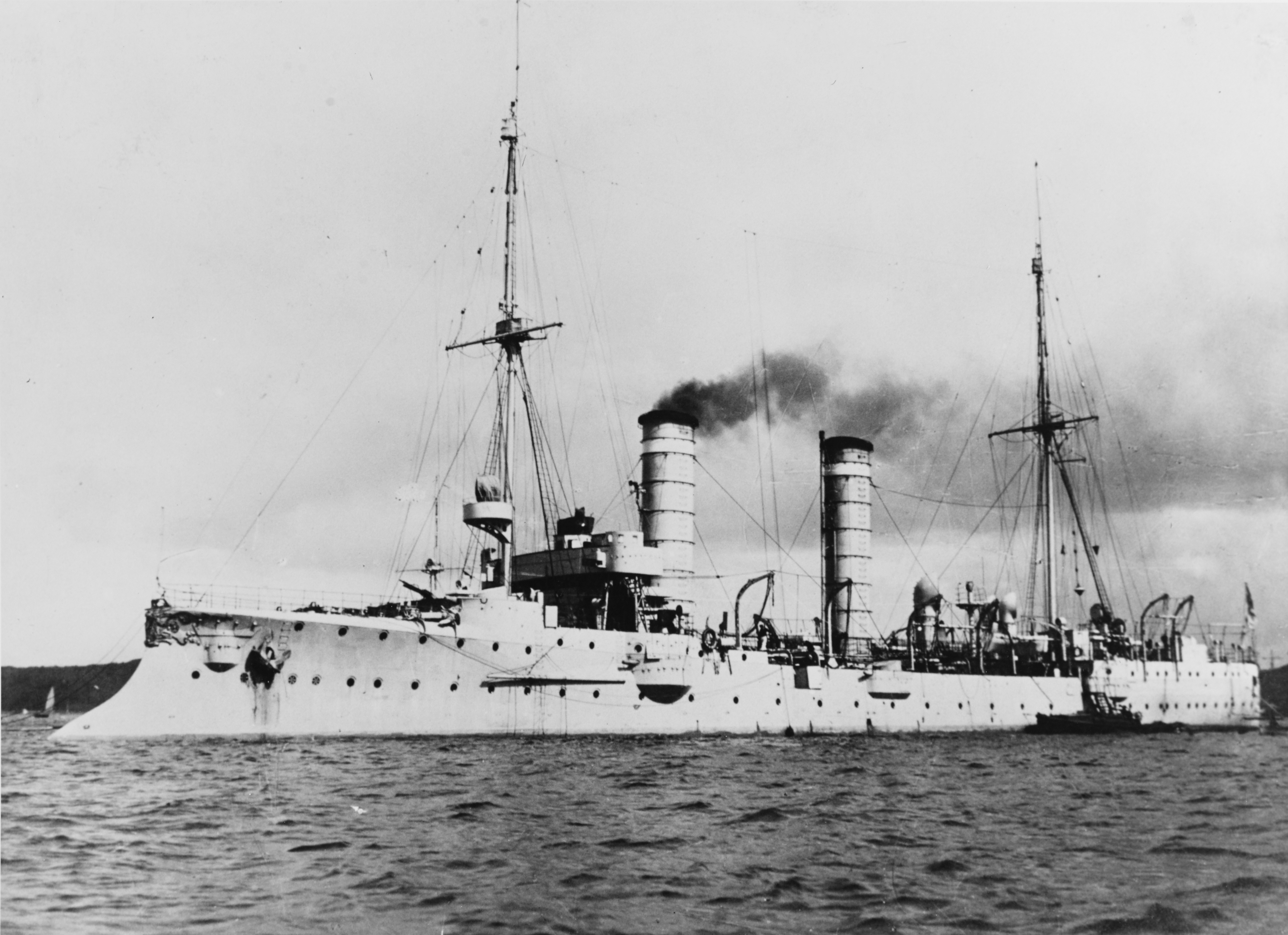
- Ariadne before the war

History

German Empire
- Name: Ariadne
- Namesake: Ariadne
- Laid down: 14 December 1899
- Launched: 10 August 1900
- Commissioned: 18 May 1901
- Fate: Sunk at Battle of Helgoland Bight on 28 August 1914

General characteristics
- Class & type: Gazelle-class cruiser
- Displacement: Normal: 2,659 t (2,617 long tons); Full load: 3,006 t (2,959 long tons)
- Length: 105.10 m (344 ft 10 in) loa
- Beam: 12.2 m (40 ft)
- Draft: 4.93 m (16 ft 2 in)
- Installed power: 9 × water-tube boilers; 8,000 PS (7,900 ihp)
- Propulsion: 2 × triple-expansion steam engines; 2 × screw propellers
- Speed: 21.5 knots (39.8 km/h; 24.7 mph)
- Range: 3,560 nmi (6,590 km; 4,100 mi) at 12 kn (22 km/h; 14 mph)
- Complement: 14 officers; 243 enlisted men
- Armament: 10 × 10.5 cm (4.1 in) SK L/40 guns; 2 × 45 cm (17.7 in) torpedo tubes
- Armor: Deck: 20 to 25 mm (0.79 to 0.98 in); Conning tower 80 mm (3.1 in); Gun shields: 50 mm (2 in)

SMS Ariadne was the fifth member of the ten-ship Gazelle class of light cruisers that were built for the German Kaiserliche Marine (Imperial Navy) in the late 1890s and early 1900s. The Gazelle class was the culmination of earlier unprotected cruiser and aviso designs, combining the best aspects of both types in what became the progenitor of all future light cruisers of the Imperial fleet. Built to be able to serve with the main German fleet and as a colonial cruiser, she was armed with a battery of ten 10.5 cm (4.1 in) guns and a top speed of 21.5 knots (39.8 km/h; 24.7 mph).

Ariadne saw little service during her career; she served with the main fleet, first in I Squadron and then with I Scouting Group between 1902 and 1906. During this period, she took part in routine training exercises and cruises abroad. Decommissioned in late 1906, she lay in reserve until the start of World War I in July 1914. Reactivated on 2 August, she served as a flotilla leader for torpedo boats guarding Germany's North Sea coast. During the Battle of Helgoland Bight on 28 August, she sortied to reinforce the ships on patrol in the Helgoland Bight, where she was surprised and sunk by British battlecruisers. Casualty figures vary, with 59 or around 250 of her crew being rescued by other German cruisers.

== Design ==
Following the construction of the unprotected cruisers of the Bussard class and the aviso Hela for the German Kaiserliche Marine (Imperial Navy), the Construction Department of the Reichsmarineamt (Imperial Navy Office) prepared a design for a new small cruiser that combined the best attributes of both types of vessels. The designers had to design a small cruiser with armor protection that had an optimal combination of speed, armament, and stability necessary for fleet operations, along with the endurance to operate on foreign stations in the German colonial empire. The resulting Gazelle design provided the basis for all of the light cruisers built by the German fleet to the last official designs prepared in 1914.

Plan, profile, and cross-section of the Gazelle class

Ariadne was 105.1 meters (344 ft 10 in) long overall and had a beam of 12.2 m (40 ft) and a draft of 4.93 m (16 ft 2 in) forward. She displaced 2,659 t (2,617 long tons) normally and up to 3,006 t (2,959 long tons) at full combat load. The ship had a minimal superstructure, which consisted of a small conning tower and bridge structure. Her hull had a raised forecastle and quarterdeck, along with a pronounced ram bow. She was fitted with two pole masts. She had a crew of 14 officers and 243 enlisted men.

Her propulsion system consisted of two triple-expansion steam engines driving a pair of screw propellers. The engines were powered by nine coal-fired Marine-type water-tube boilers that were vented through a pair of funnels. They were designed to give 8,000 metric horsepower (7,900 ihp), for a top speed of 21.5 knots (39.8 km/h; 24.7 mph). Ariadne carried 560 t (550 long tons; 620 short tons) of coal, which gave her a range of 3,560 nautical miles (6,590 km; 4,100 mi) at 12 knots (22 km/h; 14 mph).

The ship was armed with ten 10.5 cm (4.1 in) SK L/40 guns in single pivot mounts. Two were placed side by side forward on the forecastle; six were located on the broadside in sponsons; and two were placed side by side aft. The guns could engage targets out to 12,200 m (13,300 yd). They were supplied with 1,000 rounds of ammunition, for 100 shells per gun. She was also equipped with two 45 cm (17.7 in) torpedo tubes with five torpedoes. They were submerged in the hull on the broadside.

The ship was protected by an armored deck that was 20 to 25 mm (0.79 to 0.98 in) thick. The deck sloped downward at the sides of the ship to provide a measure of protection against incoming fire. The conning tower had 80 mm (3.1 in) thick sides, and the guns were protected by 50 mm (2 in) thick gun shields.

== Service history ==
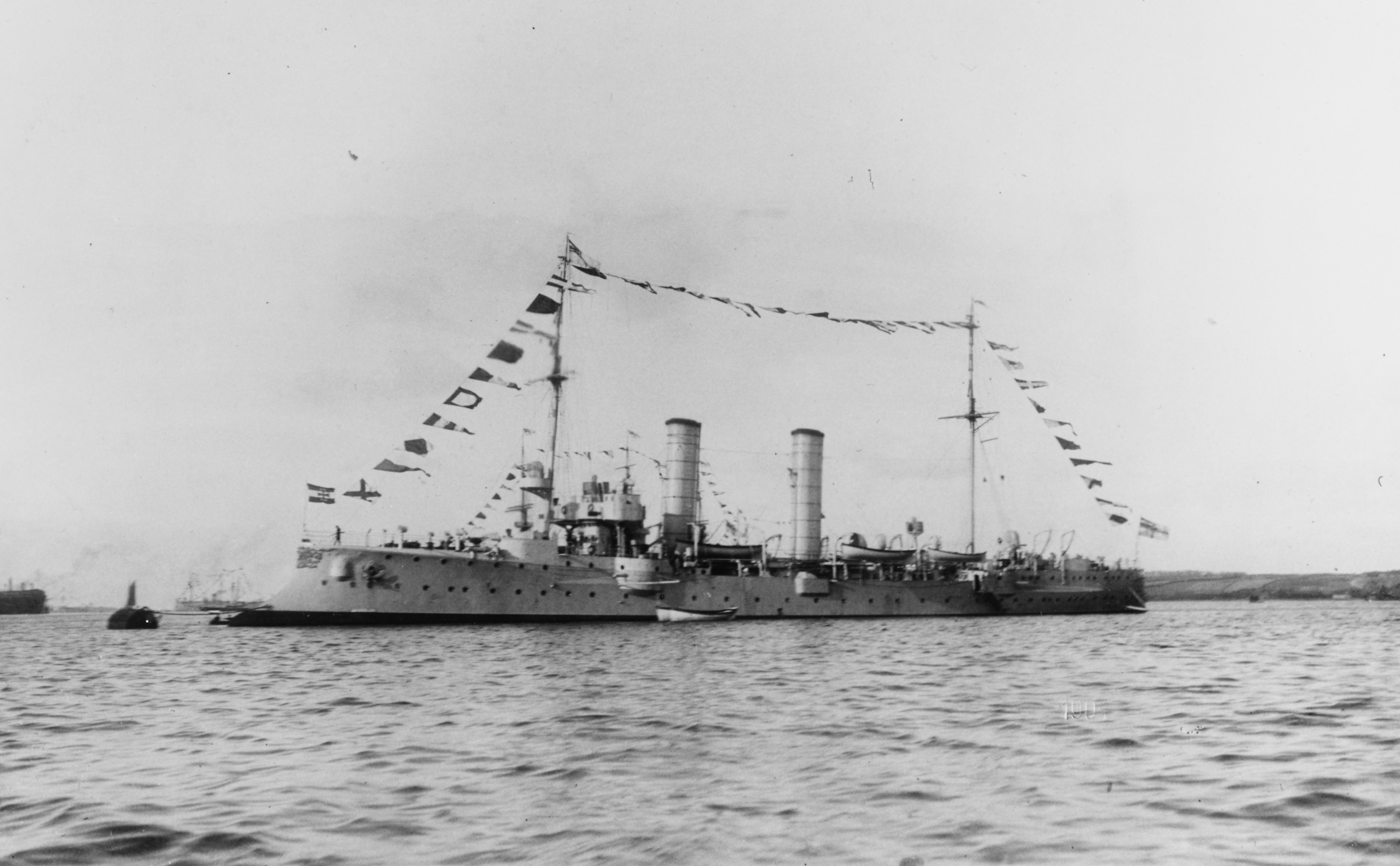
One of the Gazelle-class cruisers, possibly Ariadne, in Kiel in 1901

Ariadne was ordered under the contract name "D", (Note: German warships were ordered under provisional names. Additions to the fleet were given a single letter; ships intended to replace older or lost vessels were ordered as "Ersatz (name of the ship to be replaced)".) and was laid down at the AG Weser shipyard in Bremen on 14 December 1899. She was launched on 10 August 1900 and the director of the Kaiserliche Werft (Imperial Shipyard) in Wilhelmshaven, Konteradmiral (KAdm—Rear Admiral) Hugo von Schuckmann gave a speech at the ceremony, after which fitting-out work commenced. She was commissioned for sea trials on 18 May 1901. While on trials on 11 July, her first port side boiler exploded; three were killed and another three were injured in the accident. The ship was finally pronounced ready for service on 22 October 1902, when she was assigned to I Squadron, based in Kiel. Korvettenkapitän (KK—Corvette Captain) Adolf Josephi took command of the ship at that time. She joined the battleships of the squadron for a cruise to Norway, followed by training exercises in the North Sea. On 1 March 1903, Ariadne was assigned to I Scouting Group, the fleet's primary reconnaissance unit, commanded by KAdm Ludwig Borckenhagen.

The unit embarked on a training cruise to Spain in early 1903, during which Ariadne stopped in Brest, France on 14 May to pick up mail for the squadron. In July, the bulk of the fleet, including Adriadne, made another visit to Norwegian waters. The fleet's annual autumn training maneuvers were held in September and October, taking place in both the North and Baltic Seas. The ship took part in fleet exercises in May 1904, followed by a naval review for British King Edward VII during his visit to Kiel. The fleet then made a visit to Britain, and Ariadne later escorted Kaiser Wilhelm II's yacht Hohenzollern on a cruise from 3 to 10 September. KK Johannes Schirmer replaced Josephi at that time. In 1905, the ship took part in the year's program of training exercises, which were interrupted in March when the battleship Mecklenburg ran aground in the Great Belt; Ariadne was among the vessels sent to pull her free. In February 1906, Ariadne escorted the new battleship Preussen, which represented Germany at the coronation ceremonies for the Danish King Frederik VIII in Copenhagen. After returning to Germany, Ariadne was decommissioned in Wilhelmshaven on 22 September and placed in reserve, where she remained for the next eight years.

=== World War I ===
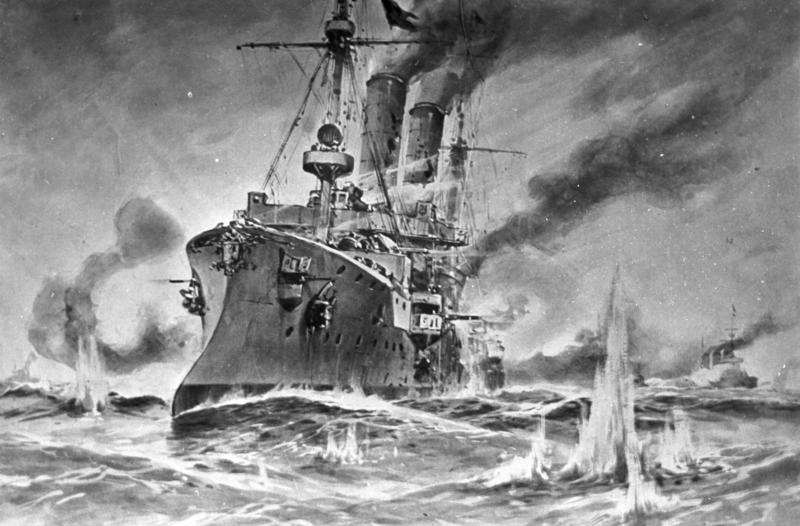
Ariadne at the Battle of Helgoland Bight

Actions of Ariadne at the Battle of Helgoland Bight

After the outbreak of World War I in July 1914, Ariadne was recommissioned on 2 August for use as a flotilla leader for the coastal defense torpedo boat flotillas that guarded the mouths of the Jade and Weser rivers. The ships were tasked with protecting these important waterways from attacks by enemy warships. Her commander was Kapitän zur See (Captain at Sea) Hans Seebohm.

On 23 August, several British commanders submitted a plan to attack the patrol line along the German coast with the light cruisers and destroyers of the Harwich Force, commanded by Commodore Reginald Tyrwhitt. These ships would be supported by submarines and Vice Admiral David Beatty's battlecruisers and associated light forces. The plan was approved and set for 28 August. The British forces began to leave port on the evening of 26 August, beginning with the submarines assigned to the operation. Most of the surface forces went to sea early on the following morning; the 7th Cruiser Squadron, which had been added to provide further support to the Harwich Force, left port later in the day.

On the morning of 28 August, Ariadne had been rotated out of the front patrol line and laid at anchor in the entrance of the Weser River in support of the cruisers and torpedo boats on patrol. After receiving reports of the British attack on the morning of the 28th, Ariadne and several other cruisers got up steam and rushed to support the German patrols. She met Stettin in heavy fog at around 13:40, but less than twenty minutes thereafter, Beatty's battlecruisers, chasing Cöln, arrived and began firing on Ariadne as well. She turned to starboard and attempted to flee. She was hit several times by the British guns, and one hit the forward boiler room. The coal bunker caught fire and five boilers were disabled; her speed fell to 15 kn (28 km/h; 17 mph). Two battlecruisers closed in, one of which was Lion, until they were firing their 12-inch (30.5 cm) and 13.5-inch (34 cm) guns at a distance of 3,000 m (3,300 yd), point-blank range for guns of that caliber. Ariadne returned fire as best she could, but to no effect.

With fires raging forward and aft, Ariadne had her forward magazine flooded so the flames would not reach the propellant charges. At 14:15, the British ceased fire and allowed Ariadne to limp away. The surviving crew that was able to escape the ship assembled on the forecastle and prepared to abandon the ship. The cruiser Danzig arrived shortly before 15:00 and began to pick up survivors, with Kolberg and Stralsund joining the rescue effort shortly thereafter. Stralsund attempted to take the crippled vessel under tow, but at 16:25, Ariadne capsized, mooting the effort to save the ship. She remained afloat for some time before she finally sank. The rescue effort was hampered by frequent explosions of ammunition stored on Ariadne's deck, which prevented boats from getting too close to the wrecked cruiser. Reports of casualties differ widely. According to the historian Gary Staff, a total of nine officers, including her commander, and fifty enlisted men were rescued. But the historians Hans Hildebrand, Albert Röhr, and Hans-Otto Steinmetz state that some 250 of her crew were rescued, with only 64 of her crew being killed in the sinking.

The wreck was discovered in 1973; it lies at a depth of about 40 m (130 ft) to the north of the island of Norderney at the coordinates 54°09′N 7°7′E. Ariadne came to rest around 4 nautical miles (7.4 km; 4.6 mi) from the location where she was reported to have sunk.
