= 10.5 cm SK L/40 naval gun =

10.5 cm SK L/40
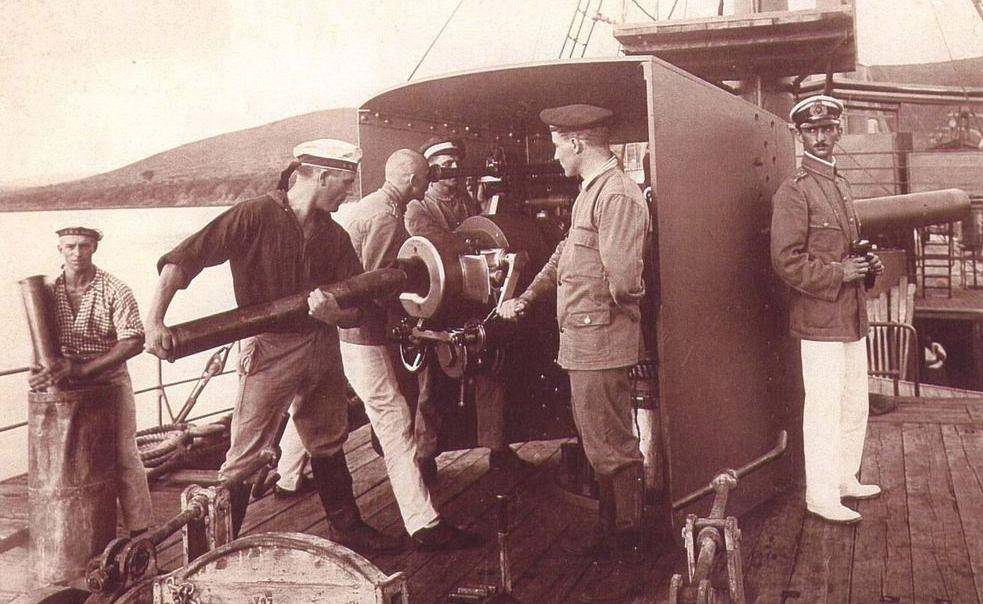
- A gun salvaged from the light cruiser Königsberg and mounted on the gunboat SS Graf von Götzen on Lake Tanganyika
- Type: Naval gun
- Place of origin: German Empire

Service history
- In service: 1900—1945
- Used by: German Empire; Weimar Republic; Nazi Germany; Ottoman Empire
- Wars: World War I World War II

Production history
- Designed: about 1898–1900

Specifications
- Mass: 1,555 kg (3,428 lb)
- Length: 4.475 m (14 ft 8 in)
- Shell: 105 x 656 mm Fixed QF ammunition
- Shell weight: 16–17.4 kg (35–38 lb)
- Caliber: 105 mm (4 in)
- Breech: Horizontal sliding-block
- Recoil: Hydro-pneumatic
- Elevation: -10° to +30°
- Traverse: 360°
- Rate of fire: 15 RPM
- Muzzle velocity: 690 m/s (2,300 ft/s)
- Maximum firing range: 12,200 m (13,300 yd) at 30°

The 10.5 cm SK L/40 (SK - Schnelladekanone (quick-loading cannon) L - Länge (with a 40-caliber long barrel) was a German naval gun used in World War I and World War II.

== Description ==
The 10.5 cm SK L/40 gun weighed 1,555 kilograms (3,428 lb), had an overall length of 4.475 m (14 ft 8.2 in). It used a horizontal sliding-block breech design.

== Naval use ==
- Bremen-class
- Dresden-class
- Gazelle-class
- Iltis-class
- Königsberg-class
- SMS Cap Trafalgar

== Surviving examples ==
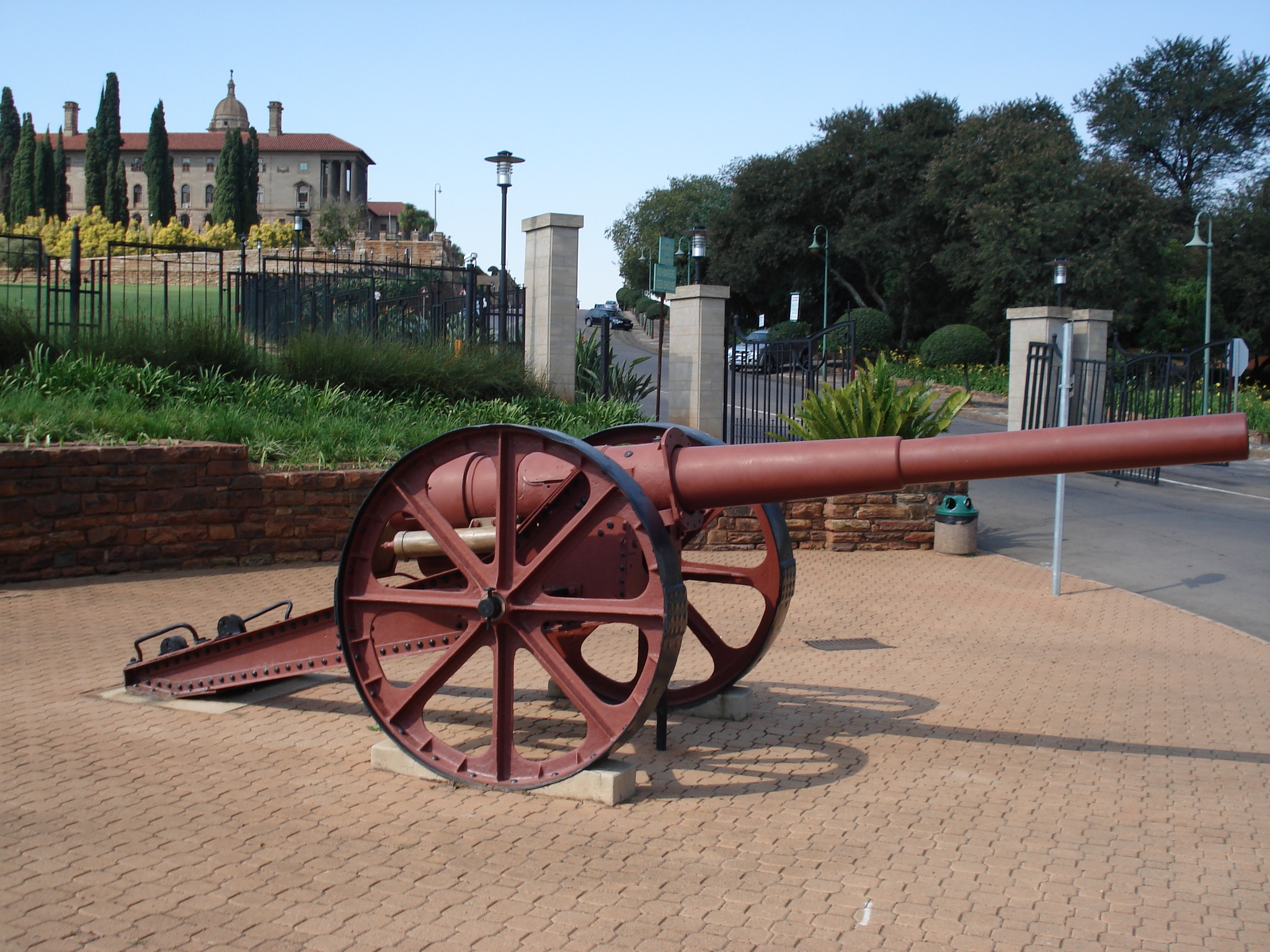
Gun from SMS Königsberg, which served ashore in the East Africa Campaign in World War I, outside the Union Buildings in Pretoria, South Africa.

- From Königsberg:
  - Nr. 369L is on display at the Union Buildings in Pretoria, South Africa
  - A second is on display at Fort Jesus, Mombasa, Kenya
  - A third is located on a traffic island in Jinja, Uganda
- From Emden:
  - A gun is on display at Hyde Park, Sydney, Australia
  - A second is located at the Royal Australian Navy Heritage Centre in HMAS Kuttabul, the main naval base in Sydney
  - A third is on display at the Australian War Memorial in Canberra
- From the Hilfskreuzer (auxiliary cruiser) Prinz Eitel Friedrich
  - A gun is on display at Memorial Park, Cambridge, NY, United States

== See also ==
- List of naval guns
- British BL 4 inch naval gun Mk VIII - firing slightly lighter shell

== Notes ==
http://www.navweaps.com/Weapons/WNGER_41-40_skc00.php

== Sources ==
- Campbell, John (2002). Naval Weapons of World War Two. London: Conway Maritime Press. ISBN 0-87021-459-4.
- Gander, Terry; Chamberlain, Peter (1979). Weapons of the Third Reich: An Encyclopedic Survey of All Small Arms, Artillery and Special Weapons of the German Land Forces 1939–1945. New York: Doubleday. ISBN 0-385-15090-3.
- Hogg, Ian V. (1997). German Artillery of World War Two (2nd corrected ed.). Mechanicsville, PA: Stackpole Books. ISBN 1-85367-480-X.
- Rolf, Rudi (1998). Der Atlantikwall: Bauten der deutschen Küstenbefestigungen 1940-1945. Osnabrück: Biblio. ISBN 3-7648-2469-7.
- Rolf, Rudi (2004). A Dictionary on Modern Fortification: An Illustrated Lexicon on European Fortification in the Period 1800-1945. Middleburg, Netherlands: PRAK.
