= Moltke-class battlecruiser =

German naval ship class (1911–1950)

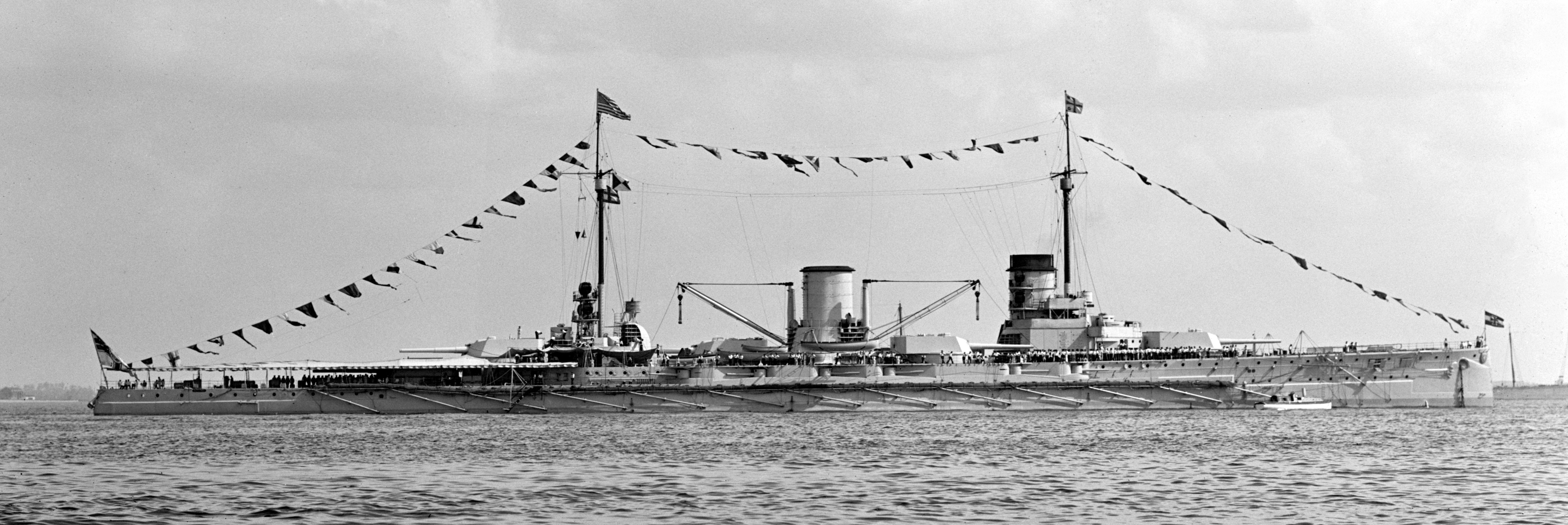
- SMS Moltke

Class overview
- Name: Moltke class
- Builders: Blohm & Voss
- Operators: Imperial German Navy; (Turkey) Ottoman/Turkish Navy
- Preceded by: SMS Von der Tann
- Succeeded by: SMS Seydlitz
- In commission: 1911–1950
- Completed: 2
- Lost: 1
- Retired: 1

General characteristics
- Type: Battlecruiser
- Displacement: Design: 22,979 t (22,616 long tons); Full load: 25,400 t (25,000 long tons)
- Length: 186.6 m (612 ft 2 in)
- Beam: 29.4 m (96 ft 5 in)
- Draft: 9.19 m (30 ft 2 in)
- Installed power: 24 × water-tube boilers; 51,289 shp (38,246 kW)
- Propulsion: 4 × screw propellers; 4 × Parsons turbines
- Speed: Design: 25.5 knots (47.2 km/h; 29.3 mph)
- Range: 4,120 nmi (7,630 km; 4,740 mi) at 14 knots (26 km/h; 16 mph)
- Complement: 43 officers; 1,010 men
- Armament: 10 × 28 cm (11 in) /50 SK guns; 12 × 15 cm (5.9 in) guns; 12 × 8.8 cm (3.5 in) guns; 4 × 50 cm (19.7 in) torpedo tubes
- Armor: Belt: 76 to 280 mm (3 to 11 in); Barbettes: 230 mm (9.1 in); Gun turrets: 230 mm; Deck: 25 to 76 mm (1 to 3 in)

The Moltke class was a class of two "all-big-gun" battlecruisers (Note: The German navy classified the ships as Großen Kreuzer (large cruisers), though they were frequently referred to as "Panzerkreuzer" (armored cruisers). These ships differed from older Großen Kreuzer, such as the Roon class, in that they carried a uniform main battery rather than four large guns and a mixed array of smaller weapons. Ships of this type were referred to as being "all-big-gun", to distinguish them from the older ships.) of the German Imperial Navy built between 1909 and 1911. Named SMS Moltke and SMS Goeben, (Note: "SMS" stands for "Seiner Majestät Schiff", or "His Majesty's Ship" in German.) they were similar to the previous battlecruiser Von der Tann, but the newer design featured several incremental improvements. The Moltkes were slightly larger, faster, and better armored, and had an additional pair of 28 cm (11 in) guns.

Both ships served during World War I. Moltke participated in several major battles with the rest of the High Seas Fleet, including the battles of Dogger Bank and Jutland in the North Sea, and the Battle of the Gulf of Riga and Operation Albion in the Baltic Sea. At the end of the war, Moltke was interned with the majority of the High Seas Fleet at Scapa Flow while the ships' fate was being discussed during peace treaty negotiations. The ships were scuttled on 21 June 1919 to prevent their seizure by the Allies.

Goeben was stationed in the Mediterranean at the start of the war; she escaped from pursuing Royal Navy ships to Constantinople. The ship, along with the light cruiser Breslau, was transferred to the Ottoman Navy soon after arrival. Strategically, Goeben played a very important role: she helped bring the Ottoman Empire into the war as a member of the Central Powers, and by acting as a fleet in being the ship prevented Anglo-French attempts to force the Bosporus, and similarly stymied a possible advance by the Russian Black Sea Fleet. Goeben was retained by the new Turkish government after the war. Only slightly modified from her original configuration, the ship remained on active service with the Turkish Navy until being decommissioned on 20 December 1950; she was stricken from the Navy register on 14 November 1954. The ship was unsuccessfully offered for sale to the West German government in 1963. Without a group willing to preserve her as a museum, the ship was sold to M.K.E. Seyman in 1971 for scrapping. She was towed to the breakers on 7 June 1973, and the work was completed in February 1976.

== Development ==
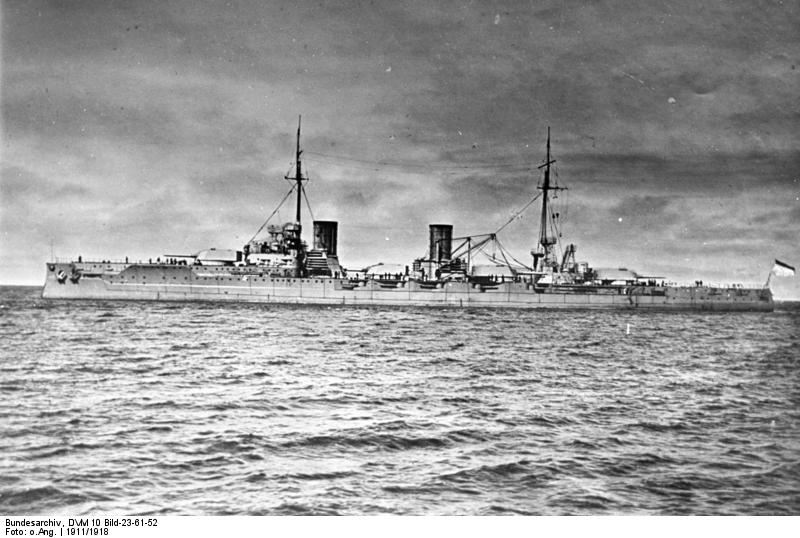
SMS Von der Tann, the basis for the Moltke design

In early 1907, the German naval command began to discuss ideas for the next design for a battlecruiser to follow the preceding vessel Von der Tann (before work on that ship had even begun). The new ship, provisionally titled "G", (Note: German warships were ordered under provisional names. Additions to the fleet were given a single letter; ships intended to replace older or lost vessels were ordered as "Ersatz (name of the ship to be replaced)".) would be ordered under the terms of the 1906 Naval Law. The question of armament came to the fore, in large part because the corresponding dreadnought battleship design, the Helgoland class, had its main battery guns increased from 28 cm (11 in) to 30.5 cm (12 in). In a meeting on 23 April, Admiral Alfred von Tirpitz, the state secretary of the Reichsmarineamt (RMA—Imperial Navy Office), issued general guidance that the new battlecruiser should be an improvement over Von der Tann, but did not specify requirements. The RMA's Construction Department presented its ideas at a subsequent meeting on 2 May. They argued that while the available budget would allow the eight 28 cm guns to be replaced by an equal number of 30.5 cm weapons, the fact that the German fleet would likely be outnumbered by its opponents meant that a greater number of guns was more important, since it would make it easier to fight more than one ship at a time. Therefore, they advocated increasing the number of guns to twelve, but keeping the 28 cm caliber.

The next meeting took place on 7 May; there, Admiral August von Heeringen, the head of the General Navy Department, stated that the same logic that drove the navy to increase the caliber of the battleships' armament should apply to the next battlecruiser. From a tactical perspective, the new ship would be needed to fight in the line of battle against battleships, so the increased firepower was necessary. He argued that an armament of ten 30.5 cm guns could be arranged on the ship and remain within budgetary constraints. He requested the design staff investigate the potential for such a ship carrying its armament in the same pattern as the British HMS Dreadnought. He specified that armor protection was to remain as on Von der Tann, and the top speed should be at least 24.5 knots (45.4 km/h; 28.2 mph). Several preliminary designs were prepared with different configurations, including an eight-gun 30.5 cm ship, a ten-gun 28 cm vessel, and an alternative with eight 28 cm guns but improved armor protection. Tirpitz agreed with the Construction Office and recommended the ten-gun ship, which Kaiser Wilhelm II approved on 28 May 1907.

With the caliber argument settled and general requirements agreed upon, the project was handed over to the Construction Department to take the plan, named "G2i", and produce a finalized design. This work took longer than expected, since the design staff was already busy completing the design for the Helgoland class, and there were not enough naval architects to work on both tasks simultaneously. At the same time, some discussion was still happening over an alternative, "G5", which was in essential respects a repeat of Von der Tann, but with improved armor protection. At a conference on 26 March 1908, Tirpitz informed the other senior naval leaders that "G5" was politically infeasible, since it would increase displacement over the prescribed limit of 22,000 metric tons (21,650 long tons; 24,250 short tons). He ordered the design staff to proceed with "G2i", but to make improvements to the armor if it was possible. Soon thereafter, two of the designers wrote a memorandum to Tirpitz in which they objected to the repeated single-ship classes, citing the excessive workload the practice created. They requested that the next battlecruiser simply repeat the Von der Tann design. Nevertheless, the design staff soon completed work on the "G2i" project, which was in turn approved by Wilhelm II.

Plan and profile of the Moltke design

During the design process, several refinements to "G" were made. These included adding a pair of 15 cm (5.9 in) guns to the secondary battery, the removal of four 8.8 cm (3.5 in) guns from positions that were deemed to be unworkable, and planned lattice masts were replaced with lighter pole masts. In addition, the citadel was revised, armor thicknesses were increased, and ammunition allotments were reduced to save weight. Internally, the boiler rooms were rearranged into a wider but shorter layout to shorten the area that needed to be protected by heavy side armor. Several significant changes were made to the hull form, including the discontinuation of the old-fashioned ram bow. Lastly, Tirpitz decided to change the traditional side-by-side arrangement of the two rudders to an in-line layout, which reduced hydrodynamic losses, eliminated vibration, and improved handling and speed.

It was initially planned to build only one ship of the new design, but due to the strain on the Navy design staff, it was decided to build two ships of the new type. They were assigned under the contract names of "G" and "H". As Blohm & Voss made the lowest bid for "G", the company also secured the contract for "H". The former was assigned to the 1908–1909 building year, while the latter was assigned to 1909–1910. The contract for "G" was awarded on 17 September 1908, under building number 200. The keel was laid on 7 December 1908, and the ship was launched on 7 April 1910. "G" was commissioned on 30 September 1911 as SMS Moltke. The ship's namesake was Field Marshal Helmuth von Moltke, the Chief of Staff of the Prussian Army in the mid 19th century. "H" was ordered on 8 April 1909 with the building number 201. The ship's keel was laid on 12 August 1909; the hull was launched on 28 March 1911. After fitting-out, "H" was commissioned on 2 July 1912 as SMS Goeben. The ship was named for August Karl von Goeben, a Prussian general who served during the Franco-Prussian War.

== Design ==
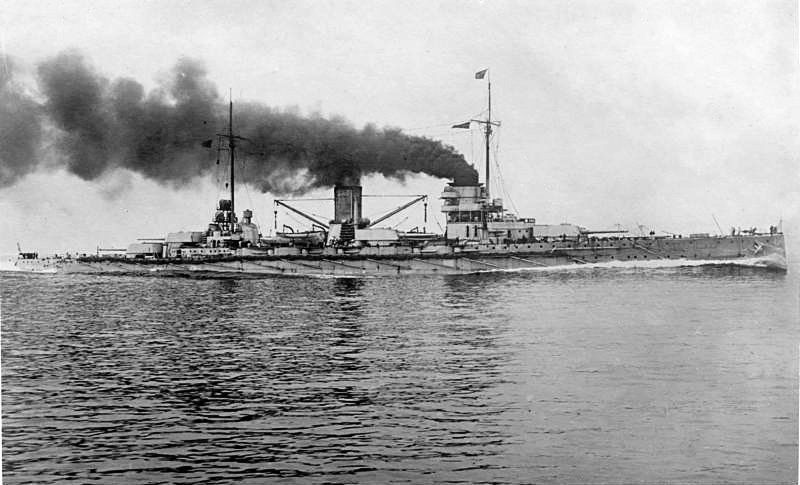
Goeben underway

=== General characteristics ===
The Moltke-class ships were 186.6 m (612 ft 2 in) long overall, 29.4 m (96 ft 5 in) wide, and had a draft of 9.19 m (30 ft 2 in) fully loaded. The ships displaced 22,979 metric tons (22,616 long tons) normally, and 25,400 t (24,999 long tons) fully loaded. The Moltke-class ships had 15 watertight compartments and a double bottom that ran for 78% of the keel of the ships. They had a long forecastle deck that ran most of the length of the ship, terminating at the rear superfiring gun turret. Their superstructure was fairly small, consisting of a large, armored conning tower forward and a smaller, secondary conning tower aft. Later in her career, Moltke had an enclosed admiral's bridge installed atop her forward conning tower. The ships' interior decks were covered with linoleum, while exterior surfaces received 65 mm (2.6 in) of teak planking. Both vessels were fitted with eight searchlights for use in night fighting; four were placed on the forward funnel and the other four were located on the aft conning tower. Moltke carried another two smaller lights for signaling purposes, while Goeben had only one.

Steering was controlled by two rudders placed in line. The ships were considered to handle well, with gentle movement even in heavy seas. However, they were slow to respond at the helm and were not particularly maneuverable at low speeds. In fact, the ships had a tighter turning circle at higher speeds; at 17 knots (31 km/h; 20 mph), their turning circle was 620 m (680 yd), but at 22 knots (41 km/h; 25 mph), the circle decreased slightly to 610 m (670 yd). When attempting to initiate a turn from being stopped, the rudders had no effect, so the turn had to be initiated by differentially running the screws. The ships lost up to 60% speed and heeled 9 degrees at full rudder.

The ships had a standard crew of 43 officers and 1010 men. While Moltke served as the flagship of I Scouting Group, this increased by 13 officers and 62 men. While serving as the second command flagship, the ship carried an additional 3 officers and 25 men to the standard complement. The ships had several smaller boats, including one picket boat, three barges, two launches, two yawls, and two dinghies. The boats were carried amidships near the wing turrets, which exposed them to significant blast effects when those guns were fired. During wartime operations, the boats were generally left ashore. Equipment to handle a floatplane was installed aboard Moltke in 1915.

=== Propulsion ===
Moltke and Goeben were powered by four-shaft Parsons turbines in two sets and 24 coal-fired Schulz-Thornycroft boilers, divided into four boiler rooms. The two aftmost rooms were divided by internal bulkheads to contain flooding, but space constraints prevented the forward two from being subdivided. The boilers consisted of one steam drum and three water drums each and produced steam at 16 standard atmospheres (240 psi). They were vented through two large funnels spaced widely apart. Moltke had a funnel cap installed after it became evident that smoke would otherwise interfere with the foremast; Goeben was completed with the cap. After 1916, the boilers were supplemented with tar-oil sprayers that were used to increase the burn rate of the low quality lignite coal available to Germany. The Parsons turbines were divided into high- and low-pressure pairs. The low-pressure turbines were the inner pair, and were placed in the aft engine room. The high-pressure turbines were on either side of the low-pressure pair, and were located in the forward wing rooms. The turbines powered four three-bladed screw propellers, 3.74 m (12 ft 3 in) in diameter. The starboard screws turned clockwise and the port pair turned counter-clockwise (when viewed from astern).

The ships' power-plants delivered a rated 52,000 metric horsepower (51,289 shp) and a top speed of 25.5 knots (47.2 km/h; 29.3 mph). However, in trials Moltke attained 85,782 metric horsepower (84,609 shp) and a top speed of 28.4 knots (52.6 km/h; 32.7 mph); Goeben's power-plant produced only a slightly lower horsepower and top speed. At 14 knots (26 km/h; 16 mph), the ships had a range of 4,120 nautical miles (7,630 km; 4,740 mi). The Moltke-class ships were equipped with 6 turbo generators that delivered 1,200 kW (1,600 hp) of power at 225 volts. The ships were designed to carry 1,000 tons of coal, although in practice they could store up to 3,100 tons. Fuel consumption on the six-hour forced trial was 0.667 kilogram per horsepower-hour at 76,795 metric horsepower (75,744 shp), and 0.712 kg per horsepower-hour at 71,275 metric horsepower (70,300 shp), respectively for the two ships.

=== Armament ===
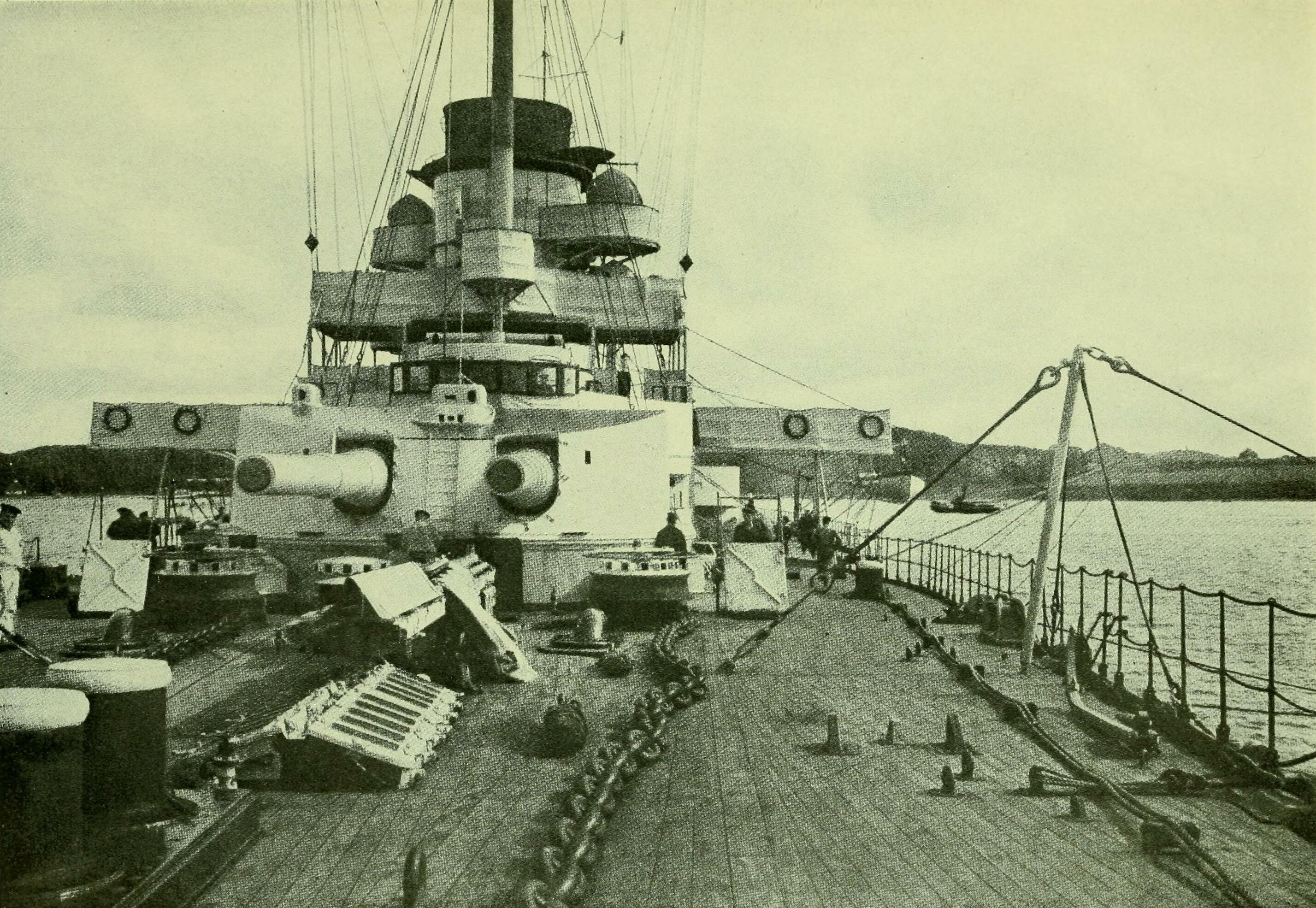
Goeben's forward gun turret

The main armament was ten 28 cm SK L/50 (Note: In Imperial German Navy gun nomenclature, "SK" (Schnelladekanone) denotes that the gun is quick firing, while the L/50 denotes the length of the gun. In this case, the L/50 gun is 50 calibers, meaning that the gun is 50 times long as it is in diameter.) guns in five twin turrets. One turret, "A", was located forward, two aft ("D" turret superfiring over "E"), and two, "B" and "C", were wing turrets mounted en echelon. The guns were placed in C/1908 turret mounts; these mountings allowed a maximum elevation of 13.5 degrees. This elevation was 7.5 degrees less than in the preceding Von der Tann, and, as a consequence, the range was slightly shorter, at 18,100 m (19,800 yd), than the 18,900 m (20,700 yd) of Von der Tann's guns. After the Battle of Dogger Bank in January 1915, where British ships had been able to open fire first, outside the range of the German guns, the turrets were modified in 1916, during a refit, to increase the maximum elevation to 16 degrees, for an increased range of 19,100 m (20,900 yd). The guns fired armor-piercing and semi-armor-piercing shells, which both weighed 302 kg (666 lb). These shells were fitted with caps to improve armor penetration; at a range of 10,000 m (10,940 yd), the shells were expected to penetrate 280 mm (11 in) of nickel steel. At a range of 12,000 m (13,120 yd), penetration fell to 200 mm (7.9 in). Barrel life was expected to be around 200 firings before the guns needed to be relined. The guns could fire at a rate of two to three rounds per minute, and had a muzzle velocity of 895 m/s (2,940 ft/s). A total of 810 of these shells were stored aboard the ship.

The ships' secondary armament consisted of twelve 15 cm (5.9 in) SK L/45 guns, mounted in the MPL C/06 mounts as in Von der Tann. The guns had a total of 1800 shells, at 150 per gun; of these, two-thirds were armor-piercing shells, and the remainder were high-explosive. The 15 cm guns had a range of 13,500 m (14,800 yd) at construction, although this was later extended to 18,800 m (20,600 yd). Their expected rate of fire was six to eight shells per minute. Aiming was conducted using a pair of telescopic sights per gun. The gun crews numbered eight men per weapon.

Initially, twelve 8.8 cm (3.5 in) guns were also fitted to defend the ships against torpedo boats and destroyers. These were also emplaced in C/01-06 pivot mounts with a total of 3,200 shells for these guns. The ammunition came in self-contained cartridges, unlike the larger guns that used separate shells and propellant charges. These guns fired a 9 kg (20 lb) shell at the high rate of 25 to 30 rounds per minute, up to a range of 10,694 m (11,695 yd) Early during World War I, both ships had the guns removed, because they were normally unusable, as they either suffered from interference from the main and secondary batteries, or they were washed out by the bow or stern waves. Aboard Moltke, the guns in the aft superstructure were replaced with four 8.8 cm Flak L/45 guns, though in late 1916, two of these were removed as well. Goeben received only two of the Flak guns.

Moltke and Goeben were also armed with four 50 cm (19.7 in) torpedo tubes that were submerged in the hull. One was located in the bow, one aft, and two on the broadside, with eleven torpedoes stored. The torpedoes were of the G/7 model, which weighed 1,365 kg (3,009 lb) and carried a 195 kg (430 lb) warhead. The torpedoes had a maximum range of 9,300 m (10,200 yd) at 27 knots (50 km/h), and 4,000 m (4,400 yd) when set at 37 knots (69 km/h).

=== Armor ===
Illustration of Moltke's side and deck armor amidships

The Moltke-class ships' armor consisted of Krupp cemented and nickel steel. Their side armor was divided into three components: a strake that extended for the full length of the hull, which comprised the belt armor. Above that, another strake that began at frame 29 (just aft of the rearmost main battery turret) and extended to frame 126 (just forward of the fore turret) was referred to as the citadel. Lastly, a third strake above the citadel covered the secondary battery casemates, extending for the length of the secondary battery. The main belt was 270 mm (10.6 in) thick for the length of the citadel, tapering down to 130 mm (5.1 in) at the bottom edge. Further aft, it reduced to 100 mm (3.9 in). The bow section of the belt tapered from 120 mm (4.7 in) down to 100 mm at the stem, and it too decreased to 80 mm at the upper edge. The citadel strake was 200 mm (7.9 in) thick, and both ends were capped with transverse bulkheads that ranged in thickness from 170 to 200 mm (6.7 to 7.9 in). Krupp steel that was 150 mm (5.9 in) thick protected the casemate battery; another pair of 120 mm (4.7 in) thick bulkheads connected the casemate armor.

A curved armor deck covered the entire hull; the central, flat portion was 1.6 m (5 ft 3 in) above the waterline, while the sloped sides extended down to connect to the bottom of the belt armor. Inside the citadel, the flat deck was 25 mm (0.98 in) thick, while the sloped sides increased to 50 mm (2 in) in thickness. Forward of the citadel, the flat and sides of the deck were a uniform 50 mm, while the stern section of the deck was increased to 80 mm on the flat and 50 mm on the sides. Atop the casemate, another 25 mm upper deck provided additional protection. The ships were protected by a torpedo bulkhead that was 30 mm (1.2 in) thick, increasing to 50 mm abreast of the wing turrets.

The forward conning tower was protected by 350 mm (13.8 in) on the front and 300 mm (11.8 in) on the sides, with an 80 mm thick roof, while the aft conning tower had 200 mm on the exposed sides and 50 mm on the roof. The four turrets had 230 mm (9.1 in) faces, 180 mm (7.1 in) sides and backs, and 90 mm (3.5 in) on the sloped roofs (decreasing to 60 mm (2.4 in) on the roof flats. They sat on armored barbettes that were 200 mm thick on their exposed sides, except for the forward mount, which received 230 mm on the front and the superfiring turret, which received only 170 mm on its exposed sides. Below the deck, where they were protected by the citadel and belt armor, they were reduced to 80 mm on the centerline turrets and 30 mm on the wing mounts. Their 15 cm guns were fitted with 80 mm thick gun shields, while most of the 8.8 cm guns received 50 mm thick shields (the stern and bow guns were not so-equipped).

== Ships ==
Ship	Namesake	Builder	Laid down	Launched	Commissioned
Moltke	Helmuth von Moltke the Elder	Blohm + Voss, Hamburg	23 January 1909	7 April 1910	30 September 1911
Goeben	August Karl von Goeben	Blohm + Voss, Hamburg	12 August 1909	28 March 1911	2 July 1912

== Service history ==
=== Moltke ===
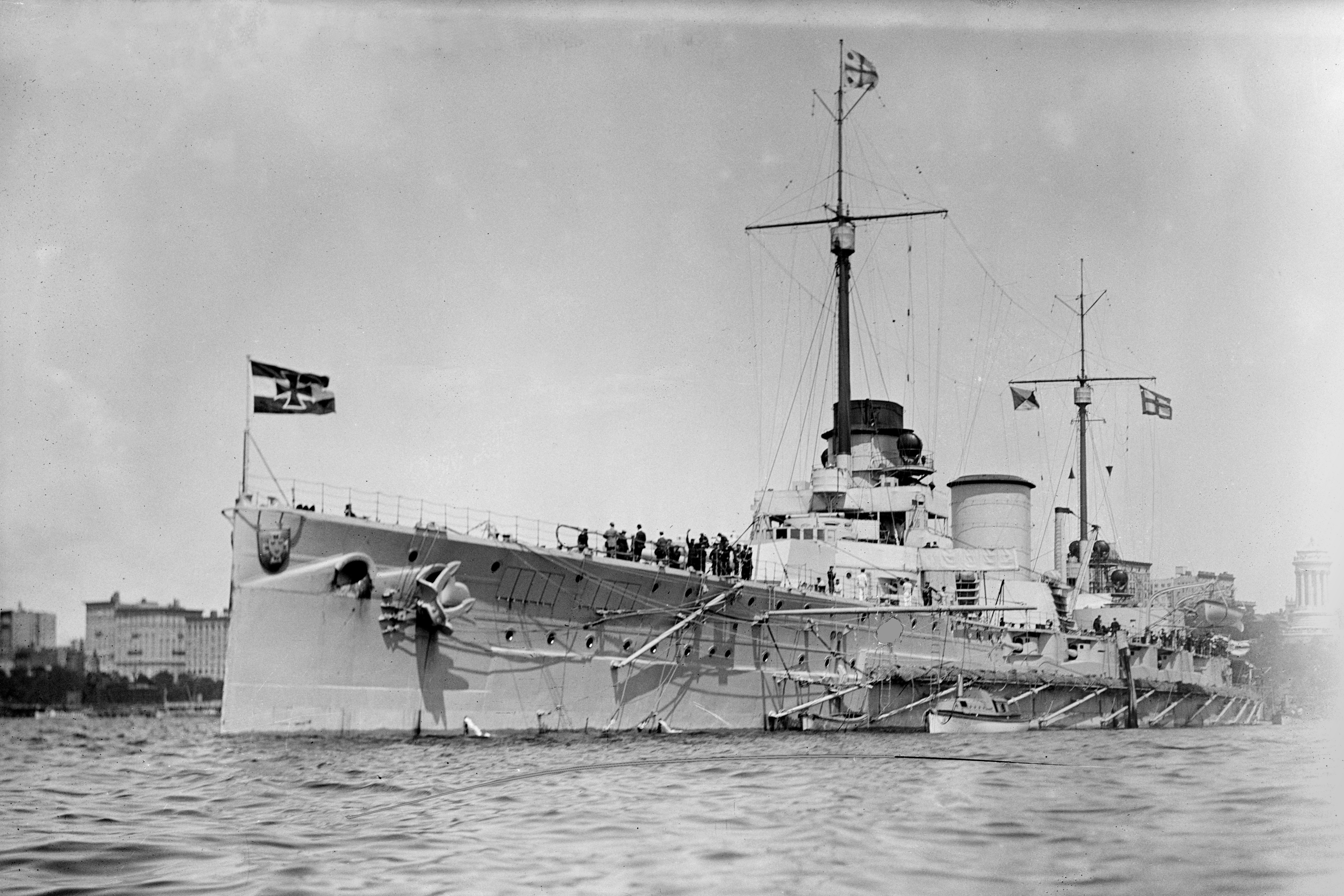
Moltke in New York City in 1912

Moltke replaced the armored cruiser Roon in I Scouting Group on 30 September 1911. On 19 April 1912, Moltke and light cruisers Stettin and Bremen departed Germany for a goodwill visit to the United States, and arrived on 30 May. In early July, Moltke escorted Kaiser Wilhelm II's yacht to Russia. Once the ship returned, the commander of I Scouting Group made Moltke his flagship—a role in which she served until Rear Admiral Franz von Hipper transferred his flag to the newer battlecruiser Seydlitz on 23 June 1914. During her pre-war years, Moltke generally spent each year on a routine training cycle that included training cruises in the North and Baltic seas, individual and unit exercises, and the annual fleet maneuvers held every August and September.

Moltke participated in most of the major fleet actions conducted by the German Navy during the First World War, including the Battles of Dogger Bank and Jutland in the North Sea, and the Battle of the Gulf of Riga and Operation Albion in the Baltic. At Jutland, the largest naval battle of the war, Moltke was heavily engaged by British forces and was hit repeatedly but was not heavily damaged. The ship took part in several operations to bombard the English coast, including the first raid on Yarmouth, the attack on the towns of Scarborough, Hartlepool, and Whitby, and the second raid on Yarmouth and Lowestoft. Moltke was damaged several times during the war: the ship was hit by heavy-caliber gunfire at Jutland, and torpedoed twice by British submarines while on fleet advances.

Following the end of the war in 1918, Moltke, together with most of the High Seas Fleet, was interned at Scapa Flow pending a decision by the Allies as to the fate of the fleet. The ship met her end when she was scuttled by her crew, along with the rest of the High Seas Fleet on 21 June 1919 to prevent them from being seized by the Royal Navy. The wreck of Moltke was raised on 10 June 1927, and scrapped at Rosyth from 1928 to 1929.

=== Goeben ===
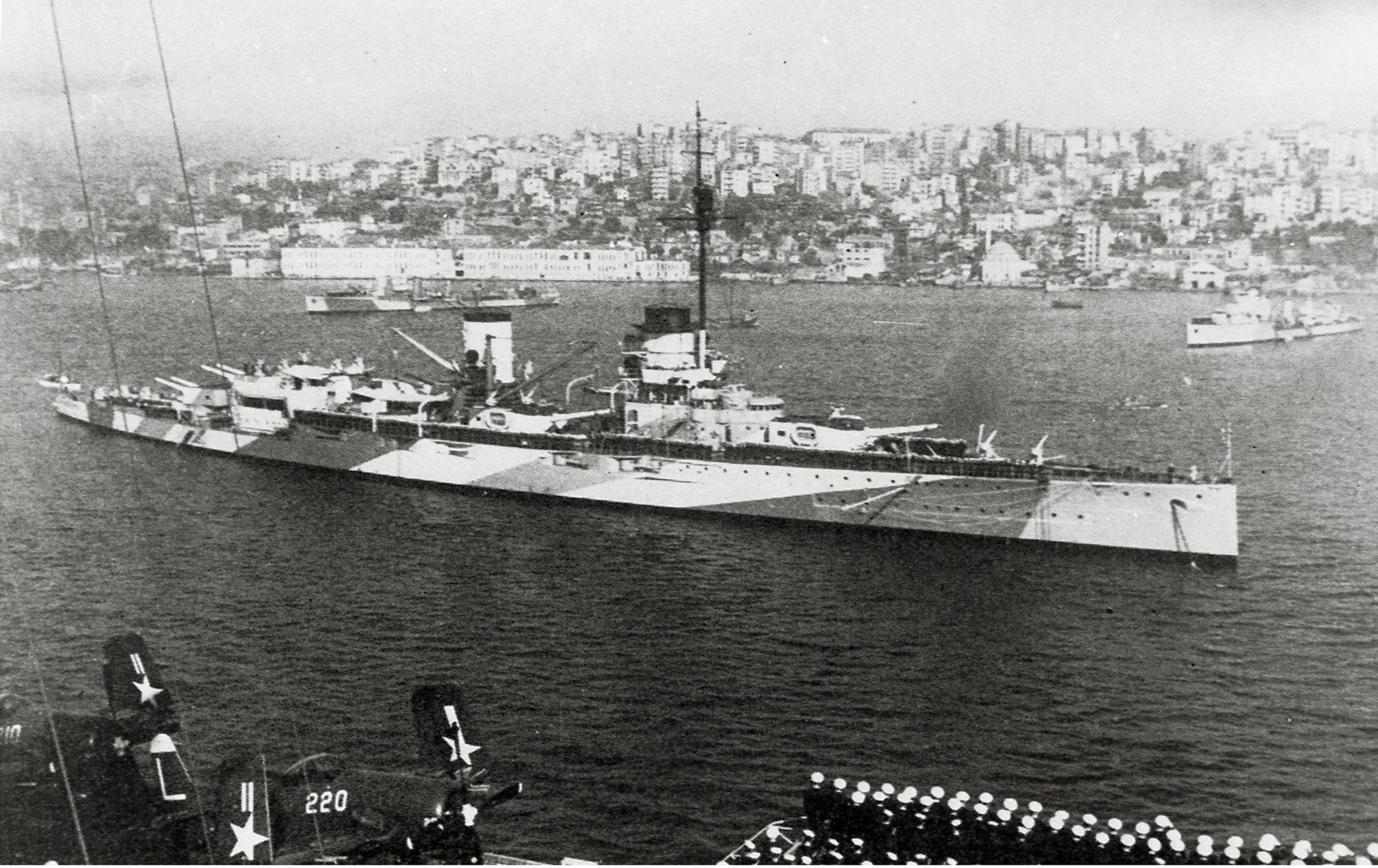
Yavuz and two Turkish destroyers at the Bosporus strait in Istanbul, viewed from the U.S. Navy aircraft carrier Leyte in 1947

Following the outbreak of the First Balkan War in October 1912, the German High Command decided to form a Mediterranean Division to exert influence in the region. The new squadron consisted of Goeben and the light cruiser Breslau; the two ships left Kiel on 4 November and arrived off Constantinople on 15 November. The ships visited several Mediterranean ports, including Venice, Pola, and Naples. The First Balkan War ended on 30 May 1913, and there was some consideration given to withdrawing the pair to German waters. However, the conflict reignited less than a month later on 29 June, meaning the ships would have to remain in the area.

Following the assassination of Archduke Franz Ferdinand on 28 June 1914, Rear Admiral Wilhelm Souchon recognized the imminent outbreak of war, and so immediately sailed to Pola for repair work for Goeben. The ships were then ordered to steam to Constantinople. While en route, they were pursued by British forces, but Goeben and Breslau managed to evade them and reach Constantinople by 10 August 1914. Goeben was transferred to the Ottoman Empire and renamed Yavûz Sultân Selîm after Sultan Selim I. Popularly known as Yavûz, she was designated as the flagship of the Ottoman Navy, but she retained her German crew. Goeben, flying the Ottoman flag, bombarded the Russian port of Sevastopol, captured and sank a Russian minesweeper, and damaged a destroyer on 29 October 1914. The Russian government responded by declaring war on the Ottoman Empire on 1 November; Britain and France followed suit on 5 November. By acting as a fleet in being, Goeben effectively blocked a Russian advance into the Bosporus, and defended against a similar incursion of British and French pre-dreadnoughts. More powerful British and French warships—which could have dealt with Goeben—could not be risked in the heavily mined and U-boat patrolled Turkish waters.

In 1936, she was officially renamed Yavûz and remained the flagship of the Turkish Navy until 1950, although the ship was largely stationary in Izmit from 1948. In 1952, Turkey joined NATO, and the ship was assigned the hull number "B70". Yavûz was decommissioned on 20 December 1950, and removed from the navy register on 14 November 1954. The Turkish government attempted to preserve the ship as a museum, including an offer to West Germany to sell the ship back in 1963, but none of the efforts were successful. Goeben was sold for scrapping in 1971, and was eventually broken up between 1973 and 1976—the last remaining ship of the Imperial German Navy.
