= 28 cm SK L/50 gun =

28 cm SK L/50
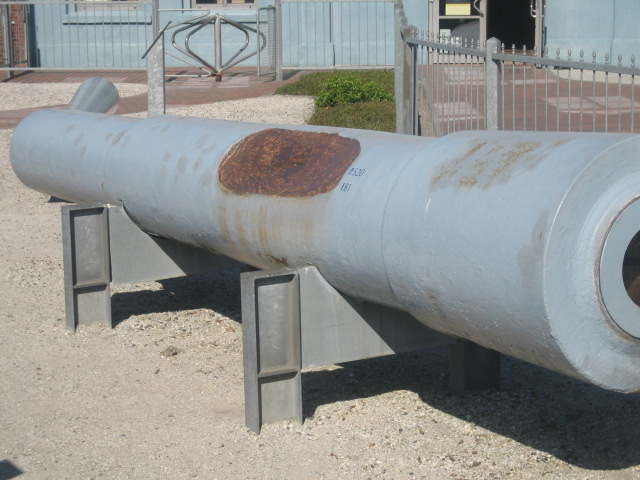
- Preserved barrel from SMS Seydlitz damaged during the Battle of Jutland in 1916
- Type: Naval gun Coast-defence gun
- Place of origin: German Empire

Service history
- In service: 1911—1945
- Used by: German Empire; Nazi Germany; Ottoman Empire; Turkey
- Wars: World War I World War II

Production history
- Designer: Krupp
- Designed: 1909—11
- Manufacturer: Krupp
- Produced: 1911—1915?

Specifications
- Mass: 41.5 metric tons (40.8 long tons; 45.7 short tons)
- Length: 14.15 m (46 ft 5 in)
- Barrel length: 13.421 m (44 ft 0.4 in) (bore length)
- Shell: separate-loading, cased charge
- Shell weight: 284–302 kg (626–666 lb)
- Caliber: 283 millimeters (11.1 in)
- Breech: horizontal sliding-wedge
- Muzzle velocity: 880–895 m/s (2,890–2,940 ft/s)

The 28 cm SK L/50 was a German naval gun that was used in World War I and World War II. (Note: SK - Schnelladekanone (quick loading cannon); L - Länge in Kaliber (length in caliber)) Originally a naval gun, it was adapted for land service after World War I.

== Description ==
The 28 cm SK L/50 gun weighed 41.5 tonnes (40.8 long tons; 45.7 short tons), had an overall length of 14.15 meters (46 ft 5 in) and its bore length was 13.421 meters (44.03 ft). Although called 28 centimeters (11 in), its actual caliber was 28.3 centimeters (11.1 in). It used the Krupp horizontal sliding-block, or "wedge", as it is sometimes referred to, breech design rather than the interrupted screw used commonly used in heavy guns of other nations. This required that the propellant charge be loaded in a metal, usually brass, case which provides obturation i.e. seals the breech to prevent escape of the expanding propellant gas.

=== Naval turrets ===
In shipboard use, these guns were mounted in twin turrets as the primary battery of three German battlecruisers: the two ships of the Moltke class (SMS Moltke and SMS Goeben) plus SMS Seydlitz, each mounting five of these turrets for a total of ten guns.

=== Coast defense guns ===
A C/37 Coastal Mounting was utilised for coastal guns. Battery Coronel at Borkum, Germany mounted four guns and Battery Grosser Kurfürst at Framzelle, France mounted four.

== See also ==
- List of naval guns

== Footnotes ==
Notes

Citations
