= SMS G7 =

1912 V1-class torpedo boat

History

German Empire
- Name: SMS G7
- Builder: Germaniawerft, Kiel
- Launched: 7 November 1911
- Completed: 30 April 1912
- Fate: To Soviet Union 1945

General characteristics
- Class & type: V1-class torpedo boat
- Displacement: 573 t (564 long tons) design
- Length: 71.5 m (234 ft 7 in) o/a
- Beam: 7.6 m (24 ft 11 in)
- Draught: 3.0 m (9 ft 10 in)
- Installed power: 16,000 PS (16,000 shp; 12,000 kW)
- Propulsion: 4 × boilers; 2 × Germania steam turbines
- Speed: 32 kn (37 mph; 59 km/h)
- Complement: 74
- Armament: 2× 8.8 cm guns; 4× 50 cm torpedo tubes

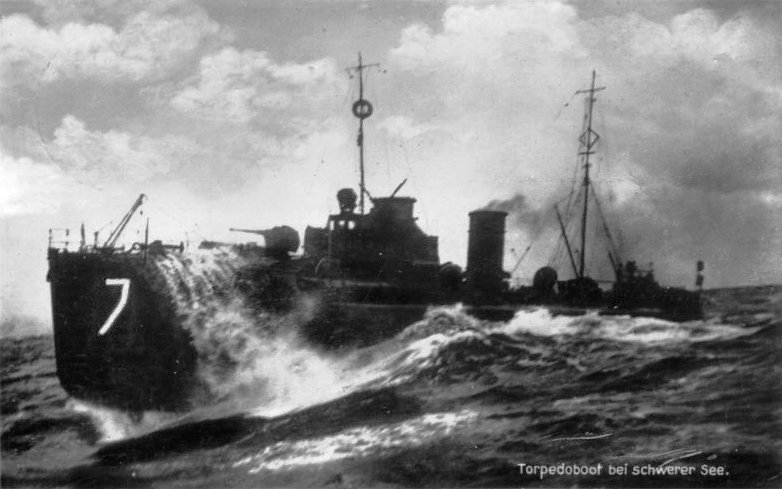
The G7 of the Grosses Torpedoboot 1911 class in a postcard

SMS G7 (Note: "SMS" stands for "Seiner Majestät Schiff" (transl. His Majesty's Ship)) (Note: The "G" in G7 denoted the shipbuilder who constructed the ship, in this case Germaniawerft.) was a V1-class large torpedo boat of the Imperial German Navy. She was built by the Germaniawerft shipyard at Kiel between 1911 and 1912, completing on 30 April 1912.

She served throughout the First World War, taking part in the Battle of Heligoland Bight on 28 August 1914, the Battle of Dogger Bank in 1915 and the Battle of Jutland in 1916.

Post war, G7 served in the Weimar Republic's Reichsmarine, and was modernised in 1928, when she was lengthened and re-armed. She continued to serve with Nazi Germany's Kriegsmarine and was renamed T107 in 1939. The ship was used as a torpedo recovery vessel during the Second World War. After the war, the ship was transferred to the Soviet Union as reparations, being renamed Porashayushtshiy before being scrapped in 1957.

== Design and construction ==
In the first decade of the 20th century, the Imperial German Navy had generally ordered twelve large torpedo boats (Große Torpedoboote) as part of each year's construction programme, with a gradual evolution of design in each year's orders, with speed, range and seaworthiness improving year-on-year. These changes resulted in the ships becoming larger, and concerns grew that the torpedo boats were becoming too big to manoeuvre in and out of the battle fleet. For the 1911 fiscal year's orders, it was decided to revert to a smaller design, with the numbering system for torpedo boats restarting as a consequence. As was normal practice, that year's order was split between two shipyards, with six (V1–V6) to be built by AG Vulcan and six (G7–G12) by Germaniawerft, with detailed design differing between the two shipyards.

Germaniawerft's design was 71.5 metres (234 ft 7 in) long overall and 71.0 metres (232 ft 11 in) between perpendiculars, with a beam of 7.56 metres (24 ft 10 in) and a draught of 3.09 metres (10 ft 2 in). Displacement was 573 tonnes (564 long tons) design and 719 tonnes (708 long tons) full load.

Three coal-fired and one oil-fired water-tube boiler fed steam at a pressure of 18 standard atmospheres (260 psi) to two sets of direct-drive steam turbines. The ship's machinery was rated at 16,000 PS (16,000 shp; 12,000 kW) giving a design speed of 32 knots (37 mph; 59 km/h). 110 tons of coal and 80 tons of oil fuel were carried, giving an endurance of 1,150 nautical miles (1,320 mi; 2,130 km) at 17 knots (20 mph; 31 km/h).

The ship was armed with two 8.8 cm SK L/30 naval guns, one on the Forecastle and one aft. Four single 50 cm (19.7 in) torpedo tubes were fitted, with two on the ship's beam in the gap between the forecastle and the ship's bridge which were capable of firing straight ahead, and two on the ship's centreline aft of the funnels. 18 mines could be carried. The ship had a crew of 74 officers and men.

G7 was laid down at Germaniawerft's Kiel shipyard as yard number 170, was launched on 7 November 1911 and completed on 30 April 1912.

=== Modifications ===
In 1916, G7 had her guns replaced by 8.8 cm SK L/45 naval guns. In 1921 the 8.8 cm guns were replaced by two 10.5 cm L/45 guns and the ship's forecastle lengthened. From 1928 to 1931, the remaining Germaniawerft-built ships of the class (i.e. G7, G8, G10 and G11) were rebuilt at Wilhelmshaven. They were lengthened to 76.1 metres (249 ft 8 in) overall and 75.7 metres (248 ft 4 in) between perpendiculars, with a beam of 7.58 metres (24 ft 10 in) and a draught of 3.13 metres (10 ft 3 in). Three oil-fired boilers replaced the existing boilers, with speed dropping to 30 knots (35 mph; 56 km/h), but range increasing to 1,900 nautical miles (2,200 mi; 3,500 km) at 17 knots. Displacement increased to 772 tonnes (760 long tons) design and 884 tonnes (870 long tons) full load. On conversion to a training role from 1936, the ship's forward gun was removed and her bridge enlarged. By 1944, armament was a single 10.5 cm gun mounted aft, with two 20 mm anti-aircraft guns.

== Service ==
On commissioning, G7 joined the 10th Half Flotilla of V Torpedo Flotilla, and remained in that flotilla in 1914.

=== First World War ===
G7 was a member of the 10th Half Flotilla of V torpedo boat flotilla of the German High Seas Fleet on the outbreak of war. On 28 August 1914, the British Harwich Force, supported by light cruisers and battlecruisers of the Grand Fleet, carried out a raid towards Heligoland with the intention of destroying patrolling German torpedo boats. The German defensive patrols around Heligoland consisted of one flotilla (I Torpedo Flotilla) of 12 modern torpedo boats forming an outer patrol line about 25 nautical miles (29 mi; 46 km) North and West of Heligoland, with an inner line of older torpedo boats of the 3rd Minesweeping Division at about 12 nautical miles (14 mi; 22 km). V Torpedo boat flotilla, including G7, together with four German light cruisers waited near Heligoland.

At about 06:00 on 28 August, the torpedo boat G194, one of the ships of the outer screen sighted the periscope of the British submarine E7, one of three submarines deployed as bait to lure the German torpedo boats away from Heligoland. G194 reported by radio her encounter with the British submarine to Rear Admiral Leberecht Maass, the commander of the German torpedo boat forces, aboard the cruiser Cöln back at Wilhelmshaven. As a result of this report, the 5th Torpedo Boat Flotilla was ordered out to hunt the hostile submarine. At 07:57 G194 was fired on by British warships, and the outer screen was soon retreating towards Heligoland. The torpedo boats of V Flotilla were unaware of the approaching British surface force, and the leading ship of the flotilla, G9 came under fire by British light cruisers and destroyers. The flotilla turned south and headed for the cover of Heligoland's guns, but V1 lagged behind and was damaged by British shells before the arrival of the German light cruiser Stettin allowed the Flotilla to escape. The torpedo boat V187 of the outer screen did not manage to evade the British force and was sunk. The intervention of the supporting British forces resulted in the sinking of the German cruisers Mainz, Cöln and Ariadne. The British light cruiser Arethusa and destroyers Laurel, Laertes and Liberty were badly damaged but safely returned to base. G7 was undamaged. On 13 October, G7 reported being unsuccessfully attacked by a submarine off the mouth of the Weser.

On 23 January 1915, the German 1st Scouting group under Admiral Franz von Hipper made a sortie to attack British fishing boats on the Dogger Bank. G7 sailed with V Flotilla as part of the German force. British Naval Intelligence was warned of the raid by radio messages decoded by Room 40, and sent out the Battlecruiser Force from Rosyth and the Harwich Force to intercept the German force. The British and German Forces met on the morning of 24 January in the Battle of Dogger Bank. On sighting the British, Hipper ordered his ships to head south-east to escape the British, who set off in pursuit. The German light cruisers and torpedo boats steamed out ahead of the heavier ships, where they were not exposed to British fire, but the armoured cruiser Blücher, the oldest and slowest of Hipper's big ships, was disabled and fell back. Hipper considered sending his torpedo boats on a high risk daylight torpedo attack against the British, but an emergency turn by the British flagship, the battlecruiser Lion to avoid a non-existent German submarine, and misinterpretation of signals caused the British battlecruisers to concentrate on Blücher, already badly damaged and trailing well behind the other German ships, and allowing the rest of Hipper's fleet to escape, and causing Hipper to cancel the torpedo attack. Blücher was overwhelmed by British torpedoes and shellfire and sank.

G7 was part of the 10th half-flotilla of V Flotilla, which sailed in support of the German High Seas Fleet, at the Battle of Jutland on 31 May – 1 June 1916. From about 20:15 CET (19:15 GMT), the German torpedo boat flotillas launched a series of torpedo attacks against the British battle line in order to cover the German fleet's turn away from the British. First to attack were VI Flotilla and IX Flotilla, followed by III Flotilla. At 20:38, V Flotilla started an attack run, but it was unable to find the British battleline due to poor visibility caused by fog and smoke, and the attack was aborted. During the night action, V Flotilla was ordered to search for and attack the British fleet, but failed to encounter the British battleships. G7 was undamaged.

=== Between the wars ===
After the end of the First World War, the scuttling of the German High Seas Fleet at Scapa Flow on 21 June 1919 and the Treaty of Versailles left Germany with a small navy of obsolete warships. The Versailles treaty limited the German Navy's torpedo forces to 16 destroyers and 16 torpedo boats, with only twelve of each in active service, with replacement of the existing ships not allowed until 15 years after they were launched. Replacements could not exceed 800 t displacement for destroyers and 200 t for torpedo boats. G7 was retained as a destroyer under the treaty, and remained in active service in the new Reichsmarine. (Note: Although treated as destroyers under the Versailles Treaty, these ships were always considered as Torpedo Boats by the Germans.) Modernised in the late 1920s, G7 remained in active service when construction of the new Type 23 and 24 torpedo boats allowed many of the older boats to be retired or moved to subsidiary duties. G7 was part of the 1st Half Flotilla in 1932, and remained in active service in 1935. In 1936 G7 was allocated to training duties and on 23 April 1939 she was renamed T107.

=== Second World War ===
The outbreak of the Second World War in September 1939 brought at least a temporary return to active service, with T107 taking part with the destroyer Richard Beitzen in an anti-shipping patrol in the Kattegat on 12–14 September 1939. T107 was employed as a tender at the torpedo school and as a torpedo recovery vessel.

=== Post-war ===
Following the end of the war, G7 was transferred to the Soviet Union as a war prize, and was renamed Porashayushtshiy (Поражающий). (Note: Poraschayuschy according to Lenton.) She joined the Soviet Baltic Fleet, where she served until 28 November 1950. The ship was then disarmed and converted into an immobile training ship, being renamed Kazanka (Казaнка) on 22 December 1950. She was stricken on 12 March 1957 and then scrapped.

== Bibliography ==
- Berezhnoy, Sergey (1994). Трофеи и репарации ВМФ СССР [Trophies and reparations of the Soviet Navy] (in Russian). Yakutsk: Sakhapoligrafizdat. OCLC 33334505.
- Campbell, John (1998). Jutland: An Analysis of the Fighting. London: Conway Maritime Press. ISBN 0-85177-750-3.
- Corbett, Julian S. (1921). Naval Operations: Vol II. History of the Great War. London: Longmans, Green and Co.
- Dodson, Aidan (2019). "Beyond the Kaiser: The IGN's Destroyers and Torpedo Boats After 1918". In Jordan, John (ed.). Warship 2019. Oxford, UK: Osprey Publishing. pp. 129–144. ISBN 978-1-4728-3595-6.
- Gardiner, Robert; Chesneau, Robert, eds. (1980). Conway's All The World's Fighting Ships 1922–1946. London: Conway Maritime Press. ISBN 0-85177-146-7.
- Gardiner, Robert; Gray, Randal, eds. (1985). Conway's All The World's Fighting Ships 1906–1921. London: Conway Maritime Press. ISBN 0-85177-245-5.
- Gröner, Erich; Jung, Dieter; Maass, Martin (1983). Die deutschen Kriegsschiffe 1815–1945: Band 2: Torpedoboote, Zerstörer, Schnellboote, Minensuchboote, Minenräumboote (in German). Koblenz: Bernard & Graef Verlag. ISBN 3-7637-4801-6.
- Groos, O. (1922). Der krieg in der Nordsee: Zweiter Band: Von Anfang September bis November 1914. Der krieg zur See 1914–1918 (in German). Berlin: Verlag von E. S. Mittler & Sohn.
- Koop, Gerhard; Schmolke, Klaus-Peter (2014). German Destroyers of World War II. Barnsley, UK: Seaforth Publishing. ISBN 978-1-84832-193-9.
- Lenton, H. T. (1975). German Warships of the Second World War. London: Macdonald and Jane's. ISBN 0-356-04661-3.
- Massie, Robert K. (2007). Castles of Steel: Britain, Germany and the Winning of the Great War at Sea. London: Vintage Books. ISBN 978-0-099-52378-9.
- Moore, John (1990). Jane's Fighting Ships of World War I. London: Studio. ISBN 1-85170-378-0.
- Monograph No. 11: The Battle of the Heligoland Bight, August 28th, 1914 (PDF). Naval Staff Monographs (Historical). Vol. III. Naval Staff, Training and Staff Duties Division. 1921. pp. 108–166.
- Monograph No. 12: The Action of Dogger Bank, January 24th, 1915 (PDF). Naval Staff Monographs (Historical). Vol. III. Naval Staff, Training and Staff Duties Division. 1921. pp. 209–226.
- Rohwer, Jürgen; Hümmelchen, Gerhard (1992). Chronology of the War at Sea 1939–1945. London: Greenhill Books. ISBN 1-85367-117-7.
- Whitley, M. J. (2000). Destroyers of World War Two: An International Encyclopedia. London: Cassell & Co. ISBN 1-85409-521-8.
