= SMS G11 =

1912 German V1-class torpedo boat

History

German Empire
- Name: SMS G11
- Builder: Germaniawerft, Kiel
- Launched: 23 April 1912
- Completed: 8 August 1912
- Fate: Bombed 3 April 1945

General characteristics
- Class & type: V1-class torpedo boat
- Displacement: 573 t (564 long tons) design
- Length: 71.5 m (234 ft 7 in) o/a
- Beam: 7.6 m (24 ft 11 in)
- Draught: 3.0 m (9 ft 10 in)
- Installed power: 16,000 PS (16,000 shp; 12,000 kW)
- Propulsion: 4 × boilers; 2 × Germania steam turbines
- Speed: 32 kn (37 mph; 59 km/h)
- Complement: 74
- Armament: 2× 8.8 cm guns; 4× 50 cm torpedo tubes

SMS G11 (Note: "SMS" stands for "Seiner Majestät Schiff" (transl. His Majesty's Ship)) (Note: The "G" in G11 denoted the shipbuilder who constructed the ship, in this case Germaniawerft.) was a V1-class large torpedo boat of the Imperial German Navy. She was built by the Germaniawerft shipyard at Kiel between 1911 and 1912, completing on 8 August 1912.

G11 served through the First World War, taking part in the Battle of Heligoland Bight in 1914, the Battle of Dogger Bank in 1915 and the Battle of Jutland in 1916. Following the end of the war, the ship continued to serve with the Weimar Republic's Reichsmarine and Nazi Germany's Kriegsmarine. In 1936, G11 became a training vessel, and in 1939 was renamed T111. She was wrecked during an air raid on Kiel on 3 April 1945 and later scuttled.

== Design and construction ==
In the first decade of the 20th century, the Imperial German Navy had generally ordered twelve large torpedo boats (Große Torpedoboote) as part of each year's construction programme, with a gradual evolution of design in each year's orders, with speed, range and seaworthiness improving year-on-year. These changes resulted in the ships becoming larger, and concerns grew that the torpedo boats were becoming too big to manoeuvre in and out of the battle fleet. For the 1911 fiscal year's orders, it was decided to revert to a smaller design, with the numbering system for torpedo boats restarting as a consequence. As was normal practice, that year's order was split between two shipyards, with six (V1–V6) to be built by AG Vulcan and six (G7–G12) by Germaniawerft, with detailed design differing between the two shipyards.

Germaniawerft's design was 71.5 metres (234 ft 7 in) long overall and 71.0 metres (232 ft 11 in) between perpendiculars, with a beam of 7.56 metres (24 ft 10 in) and a draught of 3.09 metres (10 ft 2 in). Displacement was 573 tonnes (564 long tons) design and 719 tonnes (708 long tons) full load.

Three coal-fired and one oil-fired water-tube boiler fed steam at a pressure of 18 standard atmospheres (260 psi) to two sets of direct-drive steam turbines. The ship's machinery was rated at 16,000 PS (16,000 shp; 12,000 kW) giving a design speed of 32 knots (37 mph; 59 km/h). 110 tons of coal and 80 tons of oil fuel were carried, giving an endurance of 1,150 nautical miles (1,320 mi; 2,130 km) at 17 knots (20 mph; 31 km/h).

The ship was armed with two 8.8 cm SK L/30 naval guns, (Note: SK stood for Schnellfeuerkanone (quick-firing gun).) (Note: In Imperial German Navy gun nomenclature, the L/45 denotes the length of the gun. In this case, the L/45 gun is 45 caliber, meaning that the gun is 45 times as long as it is in diameter.) (replaced by 8.8 cm SK L/45 naval guns in 1916), one on the forecastle and one aft. Four single 50 cm (19.7 in) torpedo tubes were fitted, with two on the ship's beam in the gap between the forecastle and the ship's bridge which were capable of firing straight ahead, and two on the ship's centreline aft of the funnels. 18 mines could be carried. The ship had a crew of 74 officers and men.

G11 was laid down at Germaniawerft's Kiel shipyard as yard number 174, was launched on 23 April 1912 and completed on 8 August 1912.

=== Modifications ===
In 1916, G11 had her guns replaced by 8.8 cm SK L/45 naval guns. In 1921 the 8.8 cm guns were replaced by two 10.5 cm L/45 guns and the ship's forecastle lengthened. From 1928 to 1931, the remaining Germaniawerft-built ships of the class (i.e. G7, G8, G10 and G11) were rebuilt at Wilhelmshaven. They were lengthened to 76.1 metres (249 ft 8 in) overall and 75.7 metres (248 ft 4 in) between perpendiculars, with a beam of 7.58 metres (24 ft 10 in) and a draught of 3.13 metres (10 ft 3 in). Three oil-fired boilers replaced the existing boilers, with speed dropping to 30 knots (35 mph; 56 km/h), but range increasing to 1,900 nautical miles (2,200 mi; 3,500 km) at 17 knots. Displacement increased to 772 tonnes (760 long tons) design and 884 tonnes (870 long tons) full load. On conversion to a training role from 1936, the ship's forward gun was removed and her bridge enlarged. By 1944, armament was a single 10.5 cm gun mounted aft, with two 20 mm anti-aircraft guns.

== Service ==
On commissioning, G11 joined the 10th Half-flotilla of the 5th Torpedo boat flotilla, and remained in that flotilla in April 1914.

=== First World War ===
G11 was still a member of the 10th Half-flotilla of the 5th Torpedo boat flotilla of the German High Seas Fleet on the outbreak of war. On 28 August 1914, the British Harwich Force, supported by light cruisers and battlecruisers of the Grand Fleet, carried out a raid towards Heligoland with the intention of destroying patrolling German torpedo boats. The German defensive patrols around Heligoland consisted of one flotilla (I Torpedo Flotilla) of 12 modern torpedo boats forming an outer patrol line about 25 nautical miles (29 mi; 46 km) North and West of Heligoland, with an inner line of older torpedo boats of the 3rd Minesweeping Division at about 12 nautical miles (14 mi; 22 km). The 5th Torpedo boat flotilla, together with four German light cruisers, waited near Heligoland in support. The 5th Torpedo Boat Flotilla, including G11, were sent out from Heligoland to investigate sightings of British submarines, and ran into several British destroyers. The Flotilla then turned away to try and escape the trap, but the torpedo boat V1, which along with S13 could not make full speed and lagged behind the rest of the flotilla, was hit by British shells before the arrival of the German cruiser Stettin allowed the 5th Flotilla to escape. The torpedo boat V187 of the outer screen did not manage to evade the British force and was sunk. The intervention of the supporting British forces resulted in the sinking of the German cruisers Mainz, Cöln and Ariadne. The British light cruiser Arethusa and destroyers Laurel, Laertes and Liberty were badly damaged but safely returned to base. G11 was undamaged.

On 23 January 1915, a German force of Battlecruisers and light cruisers, escorted by torpedo boats, and commanded by Admiral Franz von Hipper, made a sortie to attack British fishing boats on the Dogger Bank. G11, part of the 10th Half-Flotilla, formed part of the escort for Hipper's force. British Naval Intelligence was warned of the raid by radio messages decoded by Room 40, and sent out the Battlecruiser Force from Rosyth, commanded by Admiral Beatty aboard Lion and the Harwich Force of light cruisers and destroyers, to intercept the German force. The British and German Forces met on the morning of 24 January in the Battle of Dogger Bank. On sighting the British, Hipper ordered his ships to head south-east to escape the British, who set off in pursuit. The armoured cruiser Blücher was disabled by British shells and was sunk, but the rest of the German force escaped, with the German battlecruiser Seydlitz and the British battlecruiser Lion badly damaged.

In August 1915 the Germans detached a large portion of the High Seas Fleet for operations in the Gulf of Riga in support of the advance of German troops. It was planned to enter the Gulf via the Irben Strait, defeating any Russian naval forces and mining the entrance to Moon Sound. The deployed forces included the 5th Torpedo Boat flotilla. On 10 August, while the battlecruiser Von der Tann and cruiser Kolberg bombarded Utö island, G11 reported spotting the periscope of a submarine, one of several reported submarine sightings that caused the day's bombardment to be abandoned.

G11 was the leader of the 5th Torpedo Boat Flotilla at the Battle of Jutland on 31 May – 1 June 1916. The 5th Flotilla supported the main force of the German High Seas Fleet. G11 picked up some of the survivors from the British destroyers Nomad and Nestor, which had previously been disabled and then sunk by fire from German battleships at about 18:30–18:35 CET (17:30–17:35 GMT). From about 20:15 CET, the German torpedo boat flotillas launched a series of torpedo attacks against the British battle line in order to cover the German fleet's turn away from the British. First to attack were the 6th and 9th Flotillas, followed by the 3rd Flotilla. At 20:38, the 5th Flotilla started an attack run, but it was unable to find the British battleline due to poor visibility caused by fog and smoke, and the attack was aborted. G11 was narrowly missed by a British torpedo during one of the night actions, and then, together with V1 and V3 was fired on by a German cruiser, but escaped unharmed. In the morning of 1 June, when the German battleship Ostfriesland stuck a mine, G11, along with V3 and V5, screened the damaged Ostfriesland as she returned to port. G11 was undamaged.

By late April 1917, the torpedo boats of the 5th Torpedo Boat Flotilla had been fitted for minesweeping and their crews trained in that task, and became increasingly dedicated to minesweeping. G11 remained leader of the 5th Torpedo Boat Flotilla at the end of the War in November 1918.

=== Postwar operations ===
G11 survived the war, and was one of the twelve destroyers that the Reichsmarine was allowed to retain under the Treaty of Versailles. (Note: Although treated as destroyers under the treaty, G11 and other ships of her type were always referred to as torpedo boats by the Germans.) She (along with G7 and G8) recommissioned into the Reichsmarine on 22 March 1921 after refitting and rearming at Wilhelmshaven, and was allocated to the Baltic Sea. She was modernised in the late 1920s, and was retained in active service after the entry into service of the new Type 23 and Type 24 torpedo boats allowed many of the older boats to be retired or moved to subsidiary duties. In 1932, she was part of the 1st Half-flotilla of the 1st Torpedo Boat Flotilla. G11 remained in service when the Reichsmarine became the Kriegsmarine following the Nazi seizure of power in 1933. She was still part of the active torpedo boat flotillas in 1935.

G11 became a training ship in 1936, and was employed as a tender in a torpedo school. On 23 April 1939, the ship was renamed T111, to free up G11 for a planned class of escort ships.

T111 remained in use in training duties through the Second World War, until she was wrecked by bombs during an air raid at Kiel on 3 April 1945. The wreck was scuttled by the British on 14 December that year.

== Bibliography ==
- Campbell, John (1998). Jutland: An Analysis of the Fighting. London: Conway Maritime Press. ISBN 0-85177-750-3.
- Dodson, Aidan (2019). "Beyond the Kaiser: The IGN's Destroyers and Torpedo Boats After 1918". In Jordan, John (ed.). Warship 2019. Oxford, UK: Osprey Publishing. pp. 129–144. ISBN 978-1-4728-3595-6.
- Fock, Harald (1989). Z-Vor! Internationale Entwicklung und Kriegseinsätze von Zerstörern und Torpedobooten 1914 bis 1939 (in German). Herford, Germany: Koehlers Verlagsgesellschaft mBH. ISBN 3-7822-0207-4.
- Gardiner, Robert; Chesneau, Robert, eds. (1980). Conway's All The World's Fighting Ships 1922–1946. London: Conway Maritime Press. ISBN 0-85177-146-7.
- Gardiner, Robert; Gray, Randal, eds. (1985). Conway's All The World's Fighting Ships 1906–1921. London: Conway Maritime Press. ISBN 0-85177-245-5.
- Gröner, Erich; Jung, Dieter; Maass, Martin (1983). Die deutschen Kriegsschiffe 1815–1945: Band 2: Torpedoboote, Zerstörer, Schnellboote, Minensuchboote, Minenräumboote (in German). Koblenz: Bernard & Graef Verlag. ISBN 3-7637-4801-6.
- Groos, O. (1923). Der Krieg in der Nordsee: Dritter Band: Von Ende November 1914 bis Unfang Februar 1915. Der Krieg zur See: 1914–1918. Berlin: Verlag von E. S. Mittler und Sohn – via National Library of Estonia.
- Halpern, Paul G. (1994). A Naval History of World War I. London: UCL Press. ISBN 1-85728-498-4.
- Lenton, H. T. (1975). German Warships of the Second World War. London: Macdonald and Jane's. ISBN 0-356-04661-3.
- Massie, Robert K. (2007). Castles of Steel: Britain, Germany and the Winning of the Great War at Sea. London: Vintage Books. ISBN 978-0-099-52378-9.
- Monograph No. 11: Heligoland Bight—The Action of August 28, 1914 (PDF). Naval Staff Monographs (Historical). Vol. III. The Naval Staff, Training and Staff Duties Division. 1921. pp. 110–166.
- Moore, John (1990). Jane's Fighting Ships of World War I. London: Studio. ISBN 1-85170-378-0.
- Rollmann, Heinrich (1929). Der Krieg in der Ostsee: Zweiter Band: Das Kreigjahr 1915. Der Krieg zur See: 1914–1918 (in German). Berlin: Verlag von E. S. Mittler und Sohn.
- Tarrant, V. E. (1997). Jutland: The German Perspective. London: Arms & Armour Press. ISBN 1-85409-442-4.
- Whitley, M. J. (2000). Destroyers of World War Two: An International Encyclopedia. London: Cassell & Co. ISBN 1-85409-521-8.
