= German torpedo boats of World War II =

The German torpedo boats of World War II were armed principally, if not exclusively, with torpedoes and varied widely in size. They were not small schnellboote (known to the Allies as E-boats) but small seagoing vessels, the larger of which were comparable to destroyers. During World War II, German torpedo boats were administratively grouped into several torpedo-boat flotillas.

== Classes ==
=== World War I Vintage ===
Certain old torpedo boats and coastal motor boats from WW I were still on active service during WW II after modernisation in 1920s and 1930s. While most were converted to various auxiliary duties at the beginning of the war, several were still used in their original torpedo boat role. Examples included T107, T108, T110, T111 and T196. Several others, including T151, T153, T155, T156, T157, T158 and T190 were rearmed after the outbreak of war and used first in the invasions of Poland and Norway, and then in the latter stage of the war participated in Operation Hannibal, the German evacuation from the east. Surviving units were transferred to Allied navies after the war.

=== 1923 Type (Raubvogel) ===
The six Type 23 torpedo boats (also known as the Raubvogel (German:"Bird of prey") class) were developed from earlier designs shortly after World War I and came into service in 1926 and 1927. All built by the Naval Dockyard at Wilhelmshaven, they were named Albatross, Falke, Greif, Kondor, Möwe and Seeadler. They were the first to use electrical welding for hull construction to reduce displacement and they also introduced geared turbines. Despite the innovations, and unlike contemporary German destroyers, the Raubvogels were successful sea-boats, although limited to coastal waters, and most remained in service until 1944, by which time all had been lost.

=== 1924 Type (Raubtier) ===
The immediately following six ships of 1924 Type (Raubtier ("predator") class) had been intended to mount 12.7 cm guns but, instead, received updated 10.5 cm weapons. All six were again built by the Wilhelmshaven Naval Dockyard, and were named Iltis, Jaguar, Leopard, Luchs, Tiger and Wolf. Speed and range were improved, but otherwise, they displayed the same good and bad points as the Raubvogels and experienced similar operational conditions and upgrades. They entered service in 1927 and 1928 and all but one had been lost before mid-1942.

=== 1935 Type ===
The 1935 class were a new design, to be a maximum "declared" displacement of around 600 tons in order to come within a clause in the Washington Naval Treaty, and higher speeds than the older 1923 and 1924 classes. In practice these ships were overweight, though still too light to be seaworthy, while their high pressure turbines were unreliable and difficult to repair and maintain.

Twelve 1935s were built; unlike the preceding vessels of the 1923 and 1924 designs, these were given numbers (T1 to T12) but no names. Six were sunk, and two others scuttled, by the end of the war. Of the survivors, three were transferred abroad as war reparations and the last was scrapped in Germany.

=== 1937 Type ===
The 1937s incorporated some modifications to the 1935 design, including lower pressure turbines, but with little real improvement. They suffered from the same limitations as their predecessors

Nine ships were built, all at Schichau, Elbing; these were unnamed, but numbered T13 to T21. Three were sunk, and one scuttled, by the end of the war; of the survivors, four were transferred abroad as war reparations and the last was scrapped in Germany.

=== 1939 Type ===
The 1939 Type (sometimes referred to as the Elbings) were classed as "Fleet torpedo boats" (Flottentorpedoboot) and were a radical design departure from their predecessors – being larger and with a more balanced mix of weapons, in order to accomplish multiple mission types not typically expected of traditional torpedo boats. With a full load displacement of 1,754 tons and mounting a main armament of four 105mm (4.1 inch) guns in single placements, six 21in torpedo tubes in two triple mounts, provisions for mine-laying operations, and multiple AA mounts, they were comparable with British destroyers of the period. Fifteen ships were built at Schichau, Elbing. Like their predecessors, boats of the Elbing class were unnamed, instead being numbered T22 to T36. Eleven were lost during World War II; of the four survivors, T24 and T28 were briefly taken into service by the British Navy, T33 by the Soviet Navy, and T35 by the United States Navy.

=== 1940 Type ===
After the invasion of the Netherlands in 1940, the Dutch shipyards were almost undamaged. Therefore, the Kriegsmarine contracted three Dutch shipbuilders to build some smaller vessels. Classed as "Fleet torpedo boats" (Flottentorpedoboot) the 1940 Type was more a destroyer than a torpedo boat, with a full load displacement of 2,566 tons and carrying four 5-inch guns and eight 21-inch torpedo tubes in two quadruple mountings, and was based on Dutch designs. Twelve were ordered in 1940–1941, and numbered T61 to T72; but only eight were laid down by 1942 of which three were launched (the other five were destroyed on the slips); in 1944 these three incomplete ships (T61, T63 and T65) were transferred to the Baltic Sea to be completed, and T61 was torpedoed off the West Frisian Islands in September 1944, while the other two were captured by the Allies at Kiel and scuttled after the war.

=== 1941 Type ===
The 1941 Type Fleet torpedo boat was an improvement of the 1939 class with more powerful engines and additional anti-aircraft artillery was added. Fifteen of these boats were ordered in 1942–1944, once again all at Schichau, Elbing; numbered T37 to T51, but none of them was completed. At the end of the war, three of the few ships already launched (T37, T38 and T39) were in different stages of construction, and one of them (T37) was very close to completion. These ships were towed away from Elbing, but their construction was not continued and they were later scuttled. Of the other vessels, T40, T41, T42 and T43 were launched but were scuttled incomplete at Elbing, while the remaining vessels (T44 to T51) were destroyed on the slips when East Prussia was evacuated in May 1945.

=== 1944 Type ===
The 1944 Type Fleet torpedo boats were planned after a radical change in torpedo boat tactics. They were designed to be able to operate with other fleet units in the North Atlantic. This class had the main focus of armament changed to anti-aircraft artillery. Therefore, the main armament were four 10.5 cm flak guns, plus an increased number of smaller antiaircraft guns, but those ships kept the torpedo and mine laying abilities of their predecessors. To enable those ships for ocean operations, their range had to be dramatically enlarged. As a technical innovation, all auxiliary machinery were electrical powered instead of the usual steam powered ones. Nine vessels were planned, again all at Schichau, Elbing; these were unnamed, but numbered T52 to T60. All were cancelled before being laid down.

=== Torpedoboot Ausland ===
The Torpedoboot Ausland ("foreign torpedo boats") were small destroyers or large torpedo boats captured by Nazi Germany and incorporated into the Kriegsmarine. They were assigned a number prefixed with "TA". They were numbered from TA1 to TA49, with TA7 being assigned twice to two different ships; some never entered service for one reason or another. Additionally, 5 small destroyers captured from Norway were given names instead of TA prefixes.

In addition to these, Germans also captured 15 small coastal torpedo boats from Norway and mostly used them as patrol boats (vorpostenboote) or harbor defense boats (hafenschutzboote), but one of them, the former HNoMS Kjell, was designated as a "coastal torpedo boat" KT1. Denmark was forced to sell six of their disarmed torpedo boats to the Germans in 1941, who used them as "foreign torpedo recovery boats" TFA1-6 (torpedofangboote ausland) rather than proper torpedo boats. Similarly, the former WW1 German small torpedo boats A20 and A42, which had been transferred to Belgium after the war, were re-captured in 1940, and served in auxiliary roles alongside 2 captured Dutch torpedo boats G2 and G16, and 7 more Danish boats captured or raised after scuttling in August 1943 (Hvalrossen, Makrellen, Sælen, Søhunden, Nordkaperen, Haien and Narhvalen).

== See also ==
- Schnellboot German motor torpedo boats.
- German World War II destroyers
- Motor Torpedo Boat British MTBs
- Fairmile D motor torpedo boat British response to the E-boat
- Steam Gun Boat British E-boat hunter
- Torpedo boat general history
