= Sarpedon (disambiguation) =

Sarpedon was the name of several figures in Greek mythology.

Sarpedon may also refer to:

== Places ==
- Sarpedon (Cilicia), a town of ancient Cilicia, now in Turkey
- Sarpedon, the ancient name of the Turkish village of Burunucu
- Sarpedon, the island home of Medusa according to Hesiod

== Scientific ==
- 2223 Sarpedon, an asteroid that shares the same orbit around the Sun as the planet Jupiter
- Graphium sarpedon, a species of swallowtail butterfly found in South Asia, Southeast Asia, and Australia
- Sarpedon (beetle), a genus in the family Eucnemidae

== Ships ==
- HMS Sarpedon, various ships of the Royal Navy
- SS Sarpedon (1923), a cargo liner of the Blue Funnel Line
- USS Sarpedon (ARB-7), an Aristaeus-class battle damage repair ship

== Other uses ==
- Sarpedon Krater, alternative name for the Euphronios Krater, an ancient Greek terra cotta vase
- Sarpedon, a character in the television series Charmed
- Sarpedon, the childhood teacher of Cato the Younger
- Sarpeidon, a fictional planet, setting of the Star Trek episode All Our Yesterdays (1969).

== See also ==
- SS Sarpedon
