= HMS Sarpedon =

At least three ships of the Royal Navy have borne the name HMS Sarpedon. They are named after Sarpedon, a Greek hero and son of Zeus.

- HMS Sarpedon (1809) was an 18-gun Cherokee-class brig-sloop launched in 1809 and foundered in 1813.
- HMS Sarpedon (1913) was a Laforey-class destroyer that was renamed HMS Laertes within three months of launching in 1913.
- HMS Sarpedon (1916) was a R-class destroyer launched in 1916 and sold in 1926.

== See also ==
- Sarpedon (disambiguation)
