= SS Sarpedon =

A number of ships have been named SS Sarpedon after Sarpedon, king of the Lycians during the Trojan War:

- SS Sarpedon (1871), a 1,949-ton ship of the Blue Funnel Line
- SS Sarpedon (1877), a 2,036-ton ship of the Blue Funnel Line
- SS Sarpedon (1894), a 4,663-ton ship of the Blue Funnel Line
- SS Sarpedon (1923), an 11,321-ton ship of the Blue Funnel Line
- SS Sarpedon (1931), a 7,797-ton ship of the Blue Funnel Line, originally named SS Ajax (1931)
- MV Sarpedon (1938), an 8,983-ton ship of the Blue Funnel Line from 1967 to scrapping in 1969, formerly Glen Line's MV Denbighshire (1938).

== See also ==
- Sarpedon (disambiguation)
- USS Sarpedon (ARB-7)
