= Burunucu =

- Neighbourhood
- Location in Turkey
- Coordinates: 36°20′45″N 33°55′30″E
- Country: Turkey
- Province: Mersin
- District: Silifke
- Elevation: 15 m (49 ft)
- Population (2022): 865
- Time zone: UTC+3 (TRT)
- Postal code: 33940
- Area code: 0324

Burunucu is a neighbourhood in the municipality and district of Silifke, Mersin Province, Turkey. Its population is 865 (2022). The village is situated on the state highway D.400, almost at the midpoint between Silifke and Taşucu (a coastal town in Mersin Province), the distance to both being about 5 kilometres (3.1 mi). It is 86 kilometres (53 mi) from Mersin.

The village was the site of a port in antiquity named Sarpedon.
