= HMS Lapwing (1911) =

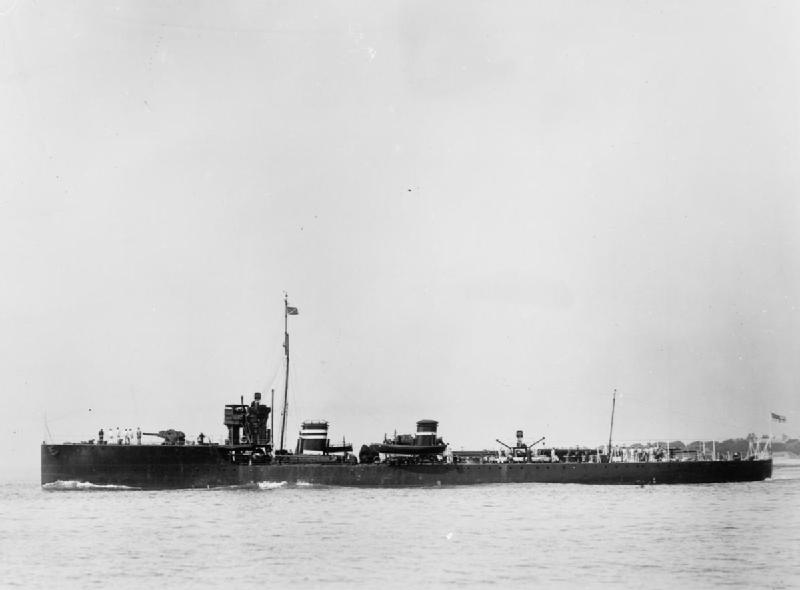
- HMS Lapwing

History

United Kingdom
- Name: HMS Lapwing
- Builder: Cammell Laird and Company, Birkenhead
- Launched: 29 September 1911
- Fate: Sold 26 October 1921

General characteristics
- Class & type: Acheron-class destroyer
- Displacement: 745 tons
- Length: 246 ft (75 m)
- Beam: 26 ft (7.9 m)
- Draught: 9 ft (2.7 m)
- Installed power: Three Yarrows boilers (oil fired); 13,500 shp (10,100 kW)
- Propulsion: Three Parsons Turbines; Three shafts
- Speed: 27 kn (50 km/h)
- Complement: 72
- Armament: 2 × BL 4-inch (101.6 mm) L/40 Mark VIII guns, mounting P Mark V; 2 × QF 12 pounder 12 cwt naval gun, mounting P Mark I; 2 × single tubes for 21 inch (533 mm) torpedoes

HMS Lapwing was an Acheron-class destroyer of the Royal Navy that served during World War I and was sold for breaking in 1921. She was the seventh Royal Navy ship to be named after Vanellus vanellus, the northern lapwing.

== Construction ==
She was built under the 1910–11 shipbuilding programme by Cammell Laird and Company of Birkenhead. She had three Parsons turbines, and three Yarrows boilers. Capable of 27 knots, she carried two 4-inch guns, other smaller guns and two 21 inch (533 mm) torpedo tubes and had a complement of 72 men. She was launched on 29 September 1911.

== Pennant Numbers ==
Pennant Number	From	To
H56	6 December 1914	1 January 1918
H48	1 January 1918	Early 1919
H09	Early 1919	9 May 1921

== Career ==
=== Pre-War ===
Lapwing served with the First Destroyer Flotilla from 1911 and, with her flotilla, joined the British Grand Fleet in 1914 on the outbreak of World War I.

=== The Battle of Heligoland Bight ===
She was present with First Destroyer Flotilla on 28 August 1914 at the Battle of Heligoland Bight, led by the light cruiser Fearless, and shared in the prize money for the battle. When HMS Laertes was seriously damaged and stopped in the water, Lapwing went to her aid under heavy fire. Lieutenant Commander Gye manoeuvred to pass a tow, but in getting underway the towing hawser parted. Laertes was saved only by the arrival of the battle cruiser Lion.

Lapwing attempts to take Laertes in tow during the Battle of Heligoland Bight

=== The Battle of Dogger Bank ===
On 24 January 1915, the First Destroyer Flotilla, including Lapwing, were present at the Battle of Dogger Bank, led by the light cruiser Aurora. Her crew shared in the Prize Money for the German armoured cruiser Blücher.

=== The Battle of Jutland ===
Lapwing, under the command of Lieutenant-Commander Alexander Gye, was present with her flotilla at the Battle of Jutland on 31 May 1916.

=== Mediterranean Service ===
From 1917 the Third Battle Squadron was deployed to the Mediterranean. She later took part in the Battle of Jaffa and was present at the entry of the Allied Fleet through the Dardanelles on 12 November 1918.

== Disposal ==
In common with the survivors of her class, she was laid up after World War I, and on 26 October 1921 she was sold to the Barking Ship Breaking Company for scrap.
