= Sarpedon (Cilicia) =

Sarpedon (Ancient Greek: Σαρπηδών) was a coastal town of ancient Cilicia, mentioned by the anonymous author of the Periplus of Pseudo-Scylax as abandoned in his time (c. 330s BCE).

Its site is likely located near Cape Sarpedonion (Incekum Burnu) in Asiatic Turkey.
