= SMS V1 =

V1-class torpedo boat of the Imperial German Navy

History

German Empire
- Name: V1
- Ordered: 1911
- Builder: AG Vulcan Stettin, Germany
- Launched: 11 September 1911
- Commissioned: 12 January 1912
- Fate: Stricken 27 March 1929

General characteristics
- Displacement: 697 t (686 long tons)
- Length: 71.1 m (233 ft 3 in) oa
- Beam: 7.6 m (24 ft 11 in)
- Draft: 3.11 m (10 ft 2 in)
- Propulsion: 4× water-tube boilers; 2× steam turbines; 17,000 metric horsepower (17,000 shp; 13,000 kW)
- Speed: 32 knots (59.3 km/h; 36.8 mph)
- Range: 1,190 nmi (2,200 km; 1,370 mi) at 17 knots (31 km/h; 20 mph)
- Complement: 74 officers and sailors
- Armament: 2 x 8.8 cm (3.5 in)/30 guns; 4 x 50 cm (20 in) torpedo tubes

SMS V1 (Note: "SMS" stands for "Seiner Majestät Schiff" (German: His Majesty's Ship)) was a V1-class torpedo boat of the Imperial German Navy. The ship was built by AG Vulcan, completing in 1912. She served in the First World War with the German High Seas Fleet, taking part in the Battle of the Heligoland Bight in 1914 and the Battle of Jutland in 1916. She was retained by the post-war German Navy and was stricken in 1929 and scrapped.

== Construction and design ==
In 1911, the Imperial German Navy placed orders for a flotilla of 12 torpedo boats as part of its shipbuilding programme for that year, with one half flotilla of six ordered from AG Vulcan, and six from Germaniawerft. (Note: The Imperial German Navy's practice was to split a year's orders into half-flotillas of six torpedo boats from different builders, to differing detailed design.) The 1911 torpedo boats were smaller than those ordered in recent years in order to be more manoeuvrable and so work better with the fleet, which resulted in the numbering series for torpedo boats being restarted. The reduction in size resulted in the ships' seaworthiness being adversely affected.

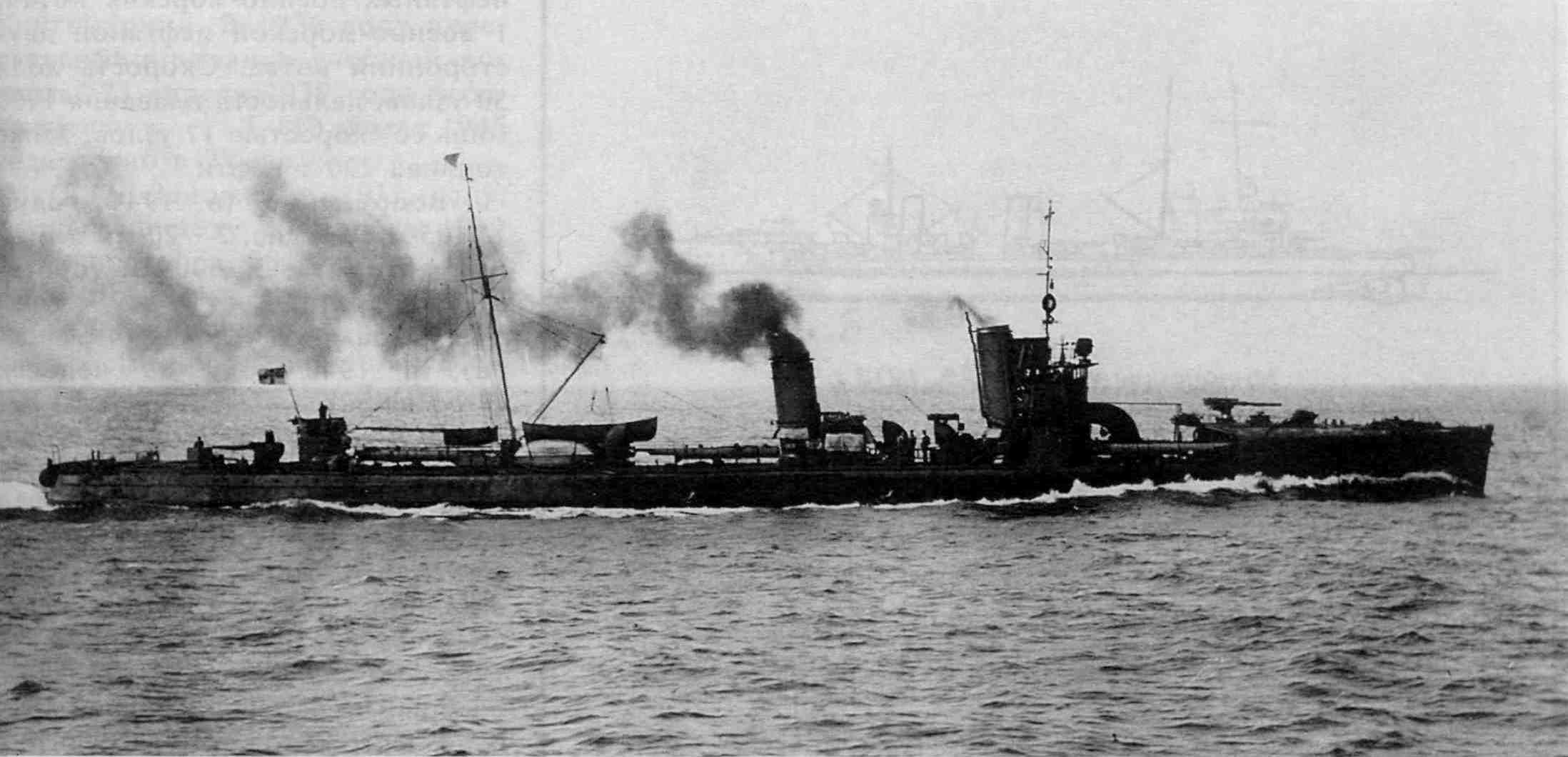
Sister ship V2

V1 (Note: The "V" in V1 denotes the shipyard at which she was built.) was launched from Vulcan's Stettin, Prussia (now Szczecin in Poland) shipyard on 11 September 1911 and commissioned on 12 January 1912.

The ship was 71.1 metres (233 ft 3 in) long overall and 70.2 metres (230 ft 4 in) at the waterline, with a beam of 7.6 metres (24 ft 11 in) and a draught of 3.11 metres (10 ft 2 in). Displacement was 569 tonnes (560 long tons) normal and 697 tonnes (686 long tons) deep load. Three coal-fired and one oil-fired water-tube boilers fed steam to two direct-drive steam turbines rated at 17,000 metric horsepower (17,000 shp; 13,000 kW), giving a design speed of 32 knots (59 km/h; 37 mph). 107 tonnes (105 long tons) of coal and 78 tonnes (77 long tons) of oil were carried, giving a range of 1,190 nautical miles (2,200 km; 1,370 mi) at 17 knots (31 km/h; 20 mph) or 490 nautical miles (910 km; 560 mi) at 29 knots (54 km/h; 33 mph).

Armament consisted of two 8.8 cm (3.5 in) SK L/30 naval guns (Note: In Imperial German Navy gun nomenclature, the L/30 denotes the length of the gun. In this case, the L/30 gun is 30 caliber, meaning that the gun is 30 times as long as it is in diameter.) in single mounts fore and aft, together with four 50 cm (19.7 in) torpedo tubes with one reload torpedo carried. Up to 18 mines could be carried. In 1916 the L/30 guns were replaced by more powerful 8.8 cm (3.5 in) SK L/45 guns. In 1921 she was rearmed with two 10.5 cm SK L/45 naval guns and two 50 cm torpedo tubes, and was fitted with new boilers, while her forecastle was extended rearwards, eliminating the exposed well-deck forward of the ship's bridge. The ship had a crew of 74 officers and other ranks.

== Service ==
In May 1913 V1 was the leader of the 9th Half-Flotilla, 5th Torpedo Boat Flotilla. On 28 August 1914, a British force of destroyers and cruisers supported by battlecruisers made a sortie into the Heligoland Bight in order to ambush German torpedo boats on patrol, which caused the Battle of Heligoland Bight. The 5th Torpedo Boat Flotilla, including V1, were sent out from Heligoland to investigate sightings of British submarines (which were deployed as bait to draw out German ships), and ran into several British destroyers. The Flotilla then turned away to try and escape the trap, but V1 and the torpedo boat S13 could not make full speed and lagged behind the rest of the flotilla. V1 was hit twice by British shells, killing 1 and wounding two, before the arrival of the German cruiser Stettin allowed the 5th Flotilla to escape. In total, however, three German light cruisers (Ariadne, Cöln and Mainz) and one torpedo boat of the German outer screen (V187) had been sunk.

On 23 January 1915, a German force of Battlecruisers and light cruisers, escorted by torpedo boats, and commanded by Admiral Franz von Hipper, made a sortie to attack British fishing boats on the Dogger Bank. V1, part of the 9th Torpedo Boat Half-Flotilla of the 5th Torpedo Boat Flotilla, formed part of the escort for Hipper's force. British Naval Intelligence was warned of the raid by radio messages decoded by Room 40, and sent out the Battlecruiser Force from Rosyth, commanded by Admiral Beatty aboard Lion and the Harwich Force of light cruisers and destroyers, to intercept the German force. The British and German Forces met on the morning of 24 January in the Battle of Dogger Bank. On sighting the British, Hipper ordered his ships to head south-east to escape the British, who set off in pursuit. The armoured cruiser Blücher was disabled by British shells and was sunk, but the rest of the German force escaped, with the German battlecruiser Seydlitz and the British battlecruiser Lion badly damaged.

On 8 September 1915, V1 was involved in a collision with the torpedo boat G12 which sank after a torpedo exploded. 35 of V1's crew were killed with a further 14 wounded, while 47 were killed aboard G12. At the Battle of Jutland on 31 May–1 June 1916, V1 was part of the 9th Half-Flotilla, 5th Torpedo Boat Flotilla, operating in support of the main German battle fleet. During the night, V1 together with V3 and G11 was fired on by a German cruiser, but escaped unharmed. On 18 August 1916, the High Seas Fleet sailed on a sortie to bombard Sunderland in order to draw out units of the British Fleet and destroy them. V1 took part with the rest of the 5th Torpedo Boat Flotilla, but no general fleet engagement took place, despite both the High Seas Fleet and the British Grand Fleet being at sea at the same time.

By late April 1917, the torpedo boats of the 5th Torpedo Boat Flotilla had been fitted for minesweeping and their crews trained in that task, and became increasingly dedicated to minesweeping. On 2 May 1917, the 9th half-flotilla was searching for mines off the mouth of the Ems when V1 struck a mine, damaging her stern. She was towed back to Wilhelmshaven. V1 remained part of the 9th half-flotilla of the 5th Torpedo Boat Flotilla at the end of the war.

V1 survived the war, and was one of the limited number of destroyers that the Reichsmarine was allowed to retain under the Treaty of Versailles. (Note: Germany was allowed to retain twelve destroyers and twelve torpedo boats in commission, plus a further four ships of each type in reserve.) (Note: Although treated as destroyers under the treaty, V1 and other ships of her class were always referred to as torpedo boats by the Germans.) By 1923, V1 was attached to the North Sea station. Between 1926 and 1929, the Reichsmarine took delivery of twelve torpedo boats of the Type 23 and Type 24 classes, replacing those old destroyers and torpedo boats in poorest condition. She was stricken on 27 March 1929 and was broken up at Wilhelmshaven.

== Bibliography ==
- Campbell, John (1998). Jutland: An Analysis of the Fighting. London: Conway Maritime Press. ISBN 0-85177-750-3.
- Dodson, Aidan (2019). "Beyond the Kaiser: The IGN's Destroyers and Torpedo Boats After 1918". In Jordan, John (ed.). Warship 2019. Oxford, UK: Osprey Publishing. pp. 129–144. ISBN 978-1-4728-3595-6.
- Fock, Harald (1989). Z-Vor! Internationale Entwicklung und Kriegseinsätze von Zerstörern und Torpedobooten 1914 bis 1939 (in German). Herford, Germany: Koehlers Verlagsgesellschaft mBH. ISBN 3-7822-0207-4.
- Gardiner, Robert; Chesneau, Roger, eds. (1980). Conway's All The World's Fighting Ships 1922–1946. London: Conway Maritime Press. ISBN 0-85177-146-7.
- Gardiner, Robert; Gray, Randal, eds. (1985). Conway's All The World's Fighting Ships 1906–1921. London: Conway Maritime Press. ISBN 0-85177-245-5.
- Gladisch, Walter (1937). Der Krieg in der Nordsee: Sechster Band: Von Juni 1916 bis Frühjahr 1917. Der Krieg zur See: 1914–1918 (in German). Berlin: Verlag von E. S. Mittler und Sohn.
- Gröner, Erich (1983). Die deutschen Kriegsschiffe 1815–1945: Band 2: Torpedoboote, Zerstörer, Schnelleboote, Minensuchboote, Minenräumboote (in German). Koblenz, Germany: Bernard & Graefe Verlag. ISBN 3-7637-4801-6.
- Groos, O. (1923). Der Krieg in der Nordsee: Dritter Band: Von Ende November 1914 bis Unfang Februar 1915. Der Krieg zur See: 1914–1918 (in German). Berlin: Verlag von E. S. Mittler und Sohn – via National Library of Estonia.
- Groos, O. (1924). Der Krieg in der Nordsee: Vierter Band: Von Unfang Februar bis Dezember 1915. Der Krieg zur See: 1914–1918 (in German). Berlin: Verlag von E. S. Mittler und Sohn – via National Library of Estonia.
- Massie, Robert K. (2007). Castles of Steel: Britain, Germany and the Winning of the Great War at Sea. London: Vintage Books. ISBN 978-0-099-52378-9.
- Monograph No. 11: Heligoland Bight—The Action of August 28, 1914 (PDF). Naval Staff Monographs (Historical). Vol. III. The Naval Staff, Training and Staff Duties Division. 1921. pp. 110–166. OCLC 220734221.
- Monograph No. 33: Home Waters—Part VII.: From June 1916 to November 1916 (PDF). Naval Staff Monographs (Historical). Vol. XVII. The Naval Staff, Training and Staff Duties Division. 1927.
- Rangeliste der Kaiserlisch-Deutschen Marine für das Jahr 1913 (in German). Berlin: Ernst Siegfried Mittler und Sohn. 1913.
