= Type 23 torpedo boat =

Ship class

- Right elevation and plan of the Type 23

Class overview
- Builders: Reichsmarinewerft Wilhelmshaven
- Operators: Reichsmarine; Kriegsmarine
- Succeeded by: Type 24 torpedo boat
- Built: 1925–1928
- In commission: 1926–1944
- Completed: 6
- Lost: 6

General characteristics (as built)
- Type: Torpedo boat
- Displacement: 798 or 923 long tons (811 or 938 t) (standard); 1,213 or 1,290 long tons (1,232 or 1,311 t) (deep load)
- Length: 87 or 87.7 m (285 ft 5 in or 287 ft 9 in) (o/a)
- Beam: 8.25 m (27 ft 1 in)
- Draft: 3.65 m (12 ft)
- Installed power: 3 × water-tube boilers; 23,000 shp (17,000 kW)
- Propulsion: 2 × shafts; 2 × geared steam turbine sets
- Speed: 32–34 knots (59–63 km/h; 37–39 mph)
- Range: 1,800 nmi (3,300 km; 2,100 mi) at 17 knots (31 km/h; 20 mph)
- Complement: 127
- Armament: 3 × single 10.5 cm (4.1 in) guns; 2 × triple 500 mm (19.7 in) torpedo tubes; 30 mines

The Type 23 torpedo boat (also known as the Raubvogel (bird of prey) or the Möwe class) was a group of six torpedo boats built for the Reichsmarine during the 1920s. As part of the renamed Kriegsmarine, the boats made multiple non-intervention patrols during the Spanish Civil War in the late 1930s. During World War II, they played a minor role in the Norwegian Campaign of 1940, Albatros being lost when she ran aground. The Type 23s spent the next several months escorting minelayers as they laid minefields and escorting ships before the ships were transferred to France around September. Möwe was torpedoed during this time and did not return to service until 1942. They started laying minefields themselves in September and continued to do so for the rest of the war.

After refits in early 1941, the boats were transferred to the Skaggerak where they were assigned escort duties. Most of the surviving ships returned to France in 1942 and helped to escort the capital ships sailing from France to Germany through the English Channel in the Channel Dash. They helped to escort blockade runners, commerce raiders and submarines through the English Channel and the Bay of Biscay throughout 1942 and 1943. Seeadler was sunk escorting a commerce raider in early 1942. Greif, however, was refitting through all of 1942 and was then assigned to escort duty in Norwegian waters before joining her sister ships in France in mid-1943.

In 1944, the Type 23s were mostly occupied with laying mines. Greif was sunk by British aircraft and Kondor was badly damaged by a mine in May. The two surviving operational boats, Falke and Möwe, attacked Allied ships during the Invasion of Normandy in June with little success and they were sunk by British bombers later that month. Kondor, the last survivor, was wrecked by bombers at the end of July.

== Design and description ==
Derived from the World War I-era large torpedo boat SMS H145, (Note: "SMS" stands for "Seiner Majestät Schiff" (German: His Majesty's Ship).) the Type 23 torpedo boat was slightly larger, but had a similar armament and speed. The boats were drier than the older design, but had a lot of weather helm so that they were "almost impossible to hold on course in wind and at low speed". The design has been criticized for being equipped with too many torpedoes for the role that they were actually used during World War II.

The first ship to be built, Möwe, was slightly smaller than her sister ships and had an overall length of 87 meters (285 ft 5 in) and was 84.7 meters (277 ft 11 in) long at the waterline because she had a round cruiser stern rather than the flat transom stern of her sisters. The other Type 23s had an overall length of 87.7 meters (287 ft 9 in) and had a waterline length of 85.7 meters (281 ft 2 in). All of the ships had a beam of 8.25 meters (27 ft 1 in), and a mean draft of 3.65 meters (12 ft). They displaced 923 long tons (938 t) at standard load and 1,290 long tons (1,310 t) at deep load. The figures for Möwe were 798 long tons (811 t) and 1,213 long tons (1,232 t) respectively. Their hull was divided into 13 watertight compartments and they were fitted with a double bottom that covered 96% of their length. Their crew consisted of 4 officers and 116 sailors.

The Type 1923s were the first German ships to use geared steam turbines and they had two sets of turbines, each driving a single three-bladed 2.5-meter (8 ft 2 in) propeller, using steam provided by three water-tube boilers that operated at a pressure of 18.5 kg/cm^{2} (1,814 kPa; 263 psi). The turbines were designed to produce 23,000 metric horsepower (17,000 kW; 23,000 shp) for a speed of 33 knots (61 km/h; 38 mph), although maximum speeds ranged from 33.69 to 31.65 knots (62.39 to 58.62 km/h; 38.77 to 36.42 mph) on the ships' sea trials. They carried a maximum of 321 tonnes (316 long tons) of fuel oil which gave a range of 1,800 nautical miles (3,300 km; 2,100 mi) at 19 knots (35 km/h; 22 mph). The effective range proved to be only 1,800 nmi (3,300 km; 2,100 mi) at that speed.

=== Armament and sensors ===
As built, the Type 23s mounted three 42-caliber 10.5-centimeter (4.1 in) SK L/45 (Note: In Imperial German Navy gun nomenclature, "SK" (Schnelladekanone) denotes that the gun is quick firing, while the L/45 denotes the length of the gun. In this case, the L/45 gun is 45 caliber, meaning that the gun is 45 times as long as it is in diameter.) guns, one forward and two aft of the superstructure; the aft superfiring gun was on an open mount while the others were protected by gun shields. The mounts had a range of elevation from -10° to +50° and the guns fired 17.4-kilogram (38 lb) projectiles at a muzzle velocity of 710 m/s (2,300 ft/s). Many guns were altered to use the ammunition of the SK C/32 gun which weighed 15.1 kilograms (33 lb) and increased the muzzle velocity to 785 m/s (2,580 ft/s). The new ammunition had a maximum range of 15,175 meters (16,596 yd) at an elevation of 44.4°. Each gun was provided with 100 shells.

The boats carried six above-water 50 cm (19.7 in) torpedo tubes in two triple mounts (the first triple mounts in German service) and could also carry up to 30 mines. After 1931, the torpedo tubes were replaced by 533-millimeter (21 in) tubes which probably used the G7a torpedo. It had a 300-kilogram (660 lb) warhead and three speed/range settings: 14,000 meters (15,000 yd) at 30 knots (56 km/h; 35 mph); 8,000 meters (8,700 yd) at 40 knots (74 km/h; 46 mph) and 6,000 meters (6,600 yd) at 44 knots (81 km/h; 51 mph).

A pair of 2-centimeter (0.8 in) C/30 (Note: In Kriegsmarine gun nomenclature, SK stands for Schiffskanone (ship's gun), C/30 stands for Constructionjahr (construction year) 1930.) anti-aircraft guns were also added after 1931. The gun had an effective rate of fire of about 120 rounds per minute. Its 0.12-kilogram (0.26 lb) projectiles were fired at a muzzle velocity of 875 m/s (2,870 ft/s) which gave it a ceiling of 3,700 meters (12,100 ft) and a maximum horizontal range of 4,800 meters (5,200 yd). Each ship carried 2,000 rounds per gun. During the war a quadruple 2 cm mount was added just forward of No. 2 gun, three 2 cm guns were positioned around the aft funnel and another pair were mounted on the bridge wings, all in single mounts. Around 1944 a FuMB 4 Sumatra radar detector was installed as was radar.

== Ships ==
Construction data
Name	Builder	Laid down	Launched	Completed	Fate
Möwe (Seagull)	Reichsmarinewerft Wilhelmshaven, Wilhelmshaven	2 March 1925	24 March 1926	1 October 1926	Sunk by aircraft, 16 June 1944
Falke (Falcon)	Reichsmarinewerft Wilhelmshaven, Wilhelmshaven	17 November 1925	29 September 1926	15 July 1928	Sunk by aircraft, 14/15 June 1944
Greif (Griffon)	Reichsmarinewerft Wilhelmshaven, Wilhelmshaven	5 October 1925	15 July 1926	15 July 1927	Sunk by aircraft, 24 May 1944
Kondor (Condor)	Reichsmarinewerft Wilhelmshaven, Wilhelmshaven	17 November 1925	22 September 1926	15 July 1928	Mined, 23 May 1944, constructive total loss 31 July or 2 August 1944
Albatros	Reichsmarinewerft Wilhelmshaven, Wilhelmshaven	5 October 1925	15 July 1926	15 May 1928	Ran aground and wrecked, 9 April 1940
Seeadler (Sea Eagle)	Reichsmarinewerft Wilhelmshaven, Wilhelmshaven	5 October 1925	15 July 1926	15 March 1927	Sunk by British MTBs during the action of 13 May 1942

== Service ==
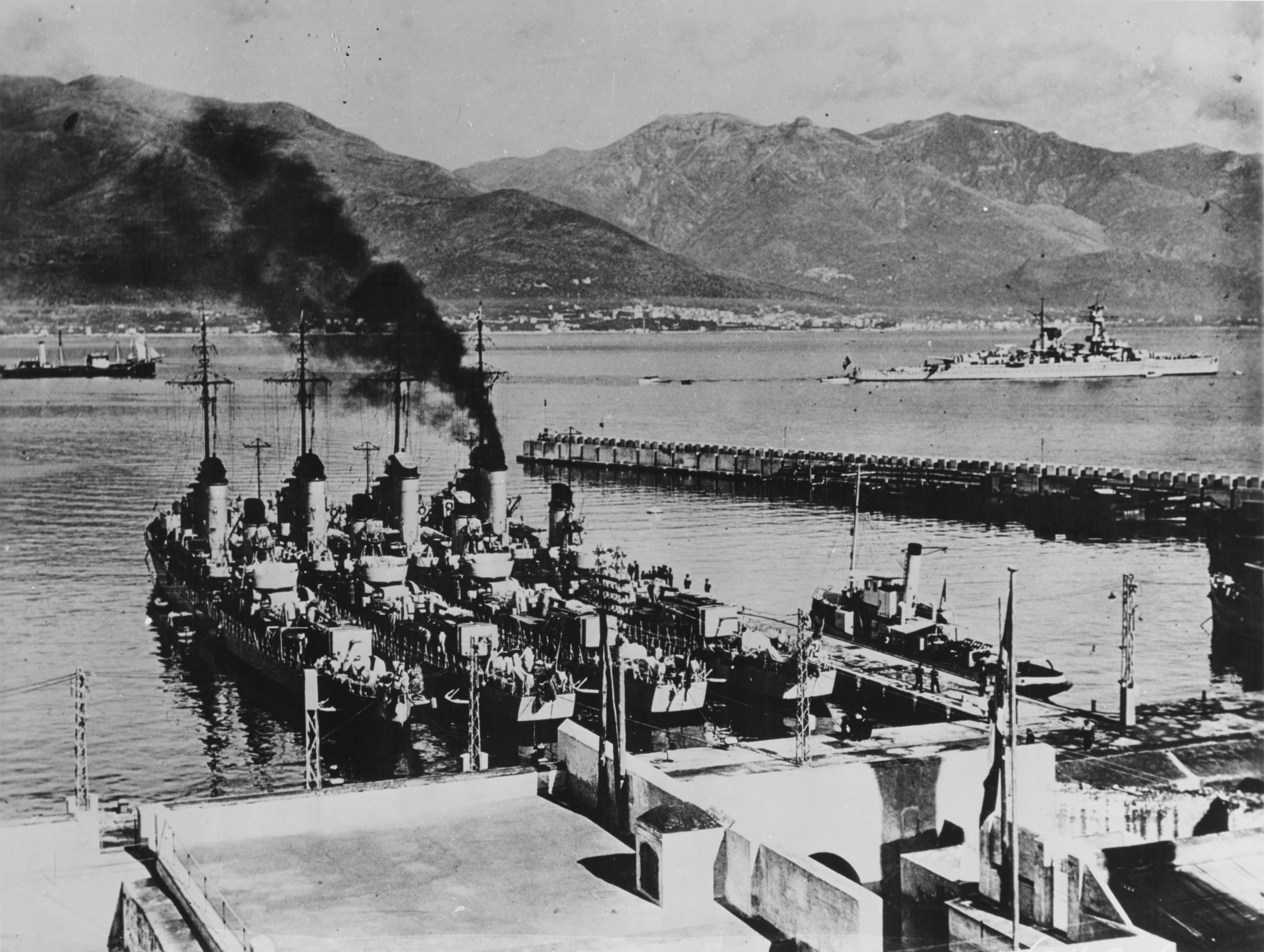
Four Type 23 boats docked in Naples, Italy, in 1938. Möwe (the leftmost boat) can be recognized by her rounded stern. Deutschland is leaving port in the right background.

Most of the boats were initially assigned to the 4th Torpedo Boat Half Flotilla. By the end of 1936, the Kriegsmarine had reorganized its torpedo boats into flotillas with Albatros and Seeadler in the 2nd Torpedo Boat Flotilla and Falke, Greif, Kondor and Möwe were assigned to the 4th Torpedo Boat Flotilla. Both flotillas made several deployments to Spain during the Spanish Civil War. After the heavy cruiser Deutschland was bombed by Republican aircraft on 29 May 1938, Adolf Hitler ordered her sister ship, the Admiral Scheer to bombard the Republican-held city of Almería. Two days later the ship did so, accompanied by the four boats of the 2nd Flotilla, including Seeadler and Albatros. Around June 1938, the flotillas were again reorganized with Seeadler going to the 4th Flotilla and Greif, Kondor and Möwe transferred to the newly formed 5th Torpedo Boat Flotilla. The other boats were either refitting or in reserve.

=== World War II ===
At the beginning of the war in September 1939, the 4th Flotilla was disbanded and Seeadler was transferred to the 6th Torpedo Boat Flotilla. All of the Type 23s supported the North Sea mining operations that began on 3 September 1939. Together with three destroyers, Albatros, Falke and Greif made anti-shipping patrols in the Kattegat and Skaggerak from 3 to 5 October that captured four ships. On 13, 18 and 19 November, the 6th Flotilla and one or two light cruisers met destroyers returning from minelaying missions of the English coast. Two days later the flotilla patrolled the Skagerrak to inspect neutral shipping for contraband goods before returning to port on the 25th. From 14 to 16 December, Seeadler and the torpedo boat Jaguar made contraband patrols in the Skaggerak, impounding six ships.

During the Invasion of Norway in April 1940, all six boats played a minor role in the initial attack. Albatros, Kondor and Möwe were assigned to support the attack on the Norwegian capital of Oslo while Falke, Greif, Seeadler were tasked to help capture Kristiansand and Aarendal on the south coast. Albatros fired the opening shots of the invasion as she crippled a Norwegian patrol boat at the mouth of the Oslofjord leading to on the evening of 8/9 April. She then participated in the capture of the naval base at Horten later that morning with her sister Kondor. That afternoon, Albatros ran aground and was wrecked. Möwe ferried troops to the Oslofjord and then searched for survivors of the sunken heavy cruiser Blücher. Greif ferried the troops that captured the undefended town of Arendal before joining Seeadler at Kristiansand after the garrison there had surrendered. Falke ferried reinforcements to Kristiansand. Despite an escort by Greif, Seeadler and the torpedo boat Luchs, a British submarine torpedoed and crippled the light cruiser Karlsruhe on 9 April, so that she had to be scuttled by Greif with a pair of torpedoes. As the heavy cruiser Lützow was proceeding to Germany without an escort two days later, she too was crippled by a British submarine off the Danish coast and all five boats responded to render assistance.

Later that month Greif, Kondor and Möwe were among the escorts for minelayers as they laid minefields in the Skaggerak and the latter was torpedoed by a British submarine on 8 May. The detonation blew her stern off and it was rebuilt in the same manner as her sisters during her lengthy repairs. For the next several months, they were also tasked to escort ships through the Skaggerak, Kattegat and Norwegian waters when not escorting minelayers. The surviving operational boats were now consolidated in the 5th Torpedo Boat Flotilla and they screened multiple minelaying missions in the southwestern North Sea in August and September. At the end of the month, the flotilla laid a minefield in the English Channel and sortied into the Channel twice in October, sinking four small Allied vessels on the second occasion. The flotilla was transferred to St. Nazaire later that month and its ships laid two more minefields in the Channel in December.

==== 1941–1944 ====
Falke was transferred to Norway at the beginning of the year and escorted minelayer over the next several months while Seeadler escorted a single minelaying mission in the Channel during that time. Kondor, Falke and Seeadler were all refitted at Rotterdam, Netherlands, from March to May 1941. Greif had a shorter refit at the same dockyard that lasted April to May. All four boats were then transferred to the Skagerrak for convoy escort duties. Kondor was briefly refitted at Rotterdam from November–December while Seeadler's refit lasted from December 1941 to February 1942. Greif received a lengthy refit at Rotterdam that lasted from December 1941 to December 1942. Unlike her sisters, Falke was not refitted and rejoined the 5th Flotilla in France in January 1942 and was followed by her sisters as they finished working up. They joined the escort force for the battleships Scharnhorst and Gneisenau and the heavy cruiser Prinz Eugen on 12 February 1942 off Cap Gris-Nez during the Channel Dash. From 12 March to 2 April, the flotilla escorted the commerce raider Michel through the Channel despite heavy British attacks, damaging two British destroyers. Möwe was not fully operational until early 1942 and was transferred to France in May of that year. The flotilla escorted the commerce raider Stier through the English Channel from 12 to 19 May, during which British motor torpedo boats (MTBs) sank Seeadler and another torpedo boat on the 13th. Falke was refitted in Wilhelmshaven from June to August and returned to France. In September and October, Möwe was one of the escorts for German blockade runners sailing from ports in the Bay of Biscay en route to Japan. Falke and Kondor helped to escort the Italian blockade runner, SS Cortellazzo, from Bordeaux through the Bay of Biscay on 29–30 November.

Greif was working up through the first couple of months of 1943; in March, she helped to escort the battleships and other ships as they moved from Trondheim, Norway, to Altafjord. Another Italian blockade runner, Himalaya, escorted by Kondor and three other torpedo boats, failed in her attempt to break through the Bay of Biscay when she was spotted by British aircraft and forced to return by heavy aerial attacks on 9–11 April. Greif screened a light cruiser from Harstad to Trondheim and then to Kiel between 27 April and 3 May. On 3–7 May, Greif, Möwe, and Jaguar escorted minelayers in the North Sea as they laid new minefields. All four surviving boats laid two minefields in the English Channel on 4–6 June. Later that month the ships returned to the Bay of Biscay to help escort U-boats through the Bay and continued to do so into early August. Möwe and Kondor helped to lay two minefields in the English Channel on 3–5 September. Kondor and Greif followed this with another minefield there later that month.

The 4th and 5th Torpedo Boat Flotillas, consisting Greif, Möwe, Kondor, Jaguar, and two other torpedo boats laid minefields in the Channel on 21 and 22 March 1944. A few days later, the flotilla laid a minefield on the night of 21/22 April. The following night the torpedo boats engaged British MTBs near Cape Barfleur and sank one of them. Between 26 April and 1 May, the flotilla laid five minefields in the Channel. Three weeks later, they were ordered to transfer from Cherbourg to Le Havre and departed on the night of 23/24 May. Greif, Möwe, Falke, Kondor and Jaguar were attacked by Allied aircraft early the next day and Greif was struck by two bombs. She sank a few hours later after being towed by Möwe. About an hour later, Kondor struck a mine and had to be towed by Möwe for the remainder of the voyage. Kondor began a lengthy refit in Le Havre, but was cannibalized for spare parts after the Allies landed in Normandy on 6 June.

As the Allies began landing in Normandy, the 5th Flotilla, now consisting of Möwe, Falke, Jaguar and the newly refitted torpedo boat T29, sortied multiple times from Le Havre over the next week in attempts to sink Allied shipping. They were generally unsuccessful, only sinking the Norwegian destroyer HNoMS Svenner on 6 June. During an air raid by the Royal Air Force on the night of 14/15 June, bombs sank Falke and Jaguar and badly damaged Möwe. She finally sank on 16 June after some weapons and equipment had been salvaged. Kondor was decommissioned on 28 June and was then declared a total loss after being hit by bombs on 31 July or 2 August.

== Bibliography ==
- Campbell, John (1985). Naval Weapons of World War II. Annapolis, Maryland: Naval Institute Press. ISBN 978-0-87021-459-2.
- Friedman, Norman (2011). Naval Weapons of World War One: Guns, Torpedoes, Mines and ASW Weapons of All Nations; An Illustrated Directory. Barnsley, UK: Seaforth Publishing. ISBN 978-1-84832-100-7.
- Gröner, Erich (1990). German Warships 1815–1945. Vol. 1: Major Surface Warships. Annapolis, Maryland: Naval Institute Press. ISBN 0-87021-790-9.
- Haarr, Geirr H. (2010). The Battle for Norway – April–June 1940. Barnsley, UK: Seaforth Publishing. ISBN 978-1-84832-057-4.
- Haarr, Geirr H. (2013). The Gathering Storm: The Naval War in Northern Europe September 1939 – April 1940. Annapolis, Maryland: Naval Institute Press. ISBN 978-1-59114-331-4.
- Haarr, Geirr H. (2009). The German Invasion of Norway, April 1940. Annapolis, Maryland: Naval Institute Press. ISBN 978-1-59114-310-9.
- Rohwer, Jürgen (2005). Chronology of the War at Sea 1939–1945: The Naval History of World War Two (Third Revised ed.). Annapolis, Maryland: Naval Institute Press. ISBN 1-59114-119-2.
- Sieche, Erwin (1980). "Germany". In Chesneau, Roger (ed.). Conway's All the World's Fighting Ships 1922–1946. London: Conway Maritime Press. ISBN 0-85177-146-7.
- Whitley, M. J. (2000). Destroyers of World War Two: An International Encyclopedia. London: Cassell & Co. ISBN 1-85409-521-8.
- Whitley, M. J. (1991). German Destroyers of World War Two. Annapolis, Maryland: Naval Institute Press. ISBN 1-55750-302-8.
