= SMS V187 =

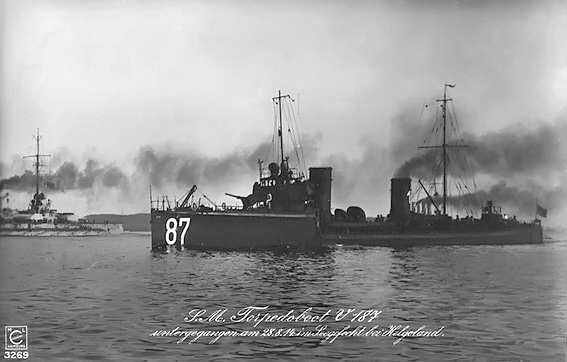

History

German Empire
- Name: SMS V187
- Builder: AG Vulcan, Stettin
- Launched: 11 January 1911
- Completed: 4 May 1911
- Fate: Sunk by British warships 28 August 1914

General characteristics
- Class & type: S138-class torpedo boat
- Displacement: 650 t (640 long tons) design
- Length: 73.9 m (242 ft 5 in) o/a
- Beam: 7.9 m (25 ft 11 in)
- Draught: 3.1 m (10 ft 2 in)
- Installed power: 18,000 PS (18,000 shp; 13,000 kW)
- Propulsion: 3 × boilers; 2 × steam turbines
- Speed: 32 kn (37 mph; 59 km/h)
- Complement: 84
- Armament: 2× 8.8 cm guns; 4× 50 cm torpedo tubes

SMS V187 (Note: "SMS" stands for "Seiner Majestät Schiff" (transl. His Majesty's Ship)) (Note: The "V" in V189 denoted the shipbuilder who constructed her, in this case AG Vulcan.) was a S-138-class large torpedo boat of the Imperial German Navy. She was built by the AG Vulcan shipyard at Stettin between 1910 and 1911 and launched on 11 January 1911.

V187 was still in service at the start of the First World War, but was sunk by British cruisers and destroyers at the Battle of Heligoland Bight on 28 August 1914.

== Construction and design ==
The Imperial German Navy ordered 12 large torpedo boats (Große Torpedoboote) as part of the fiscal year 1910 shipbuilding programme, with one half-flotilla of six ships (V186–V191) ordered from AG Vulcan and the other six ships from Germaniawerft. The two groups of torpedo boats were of basically similar layout but differed slightly in detailed design, with a gradual evolution of design and increase in displacement with each year's orders.

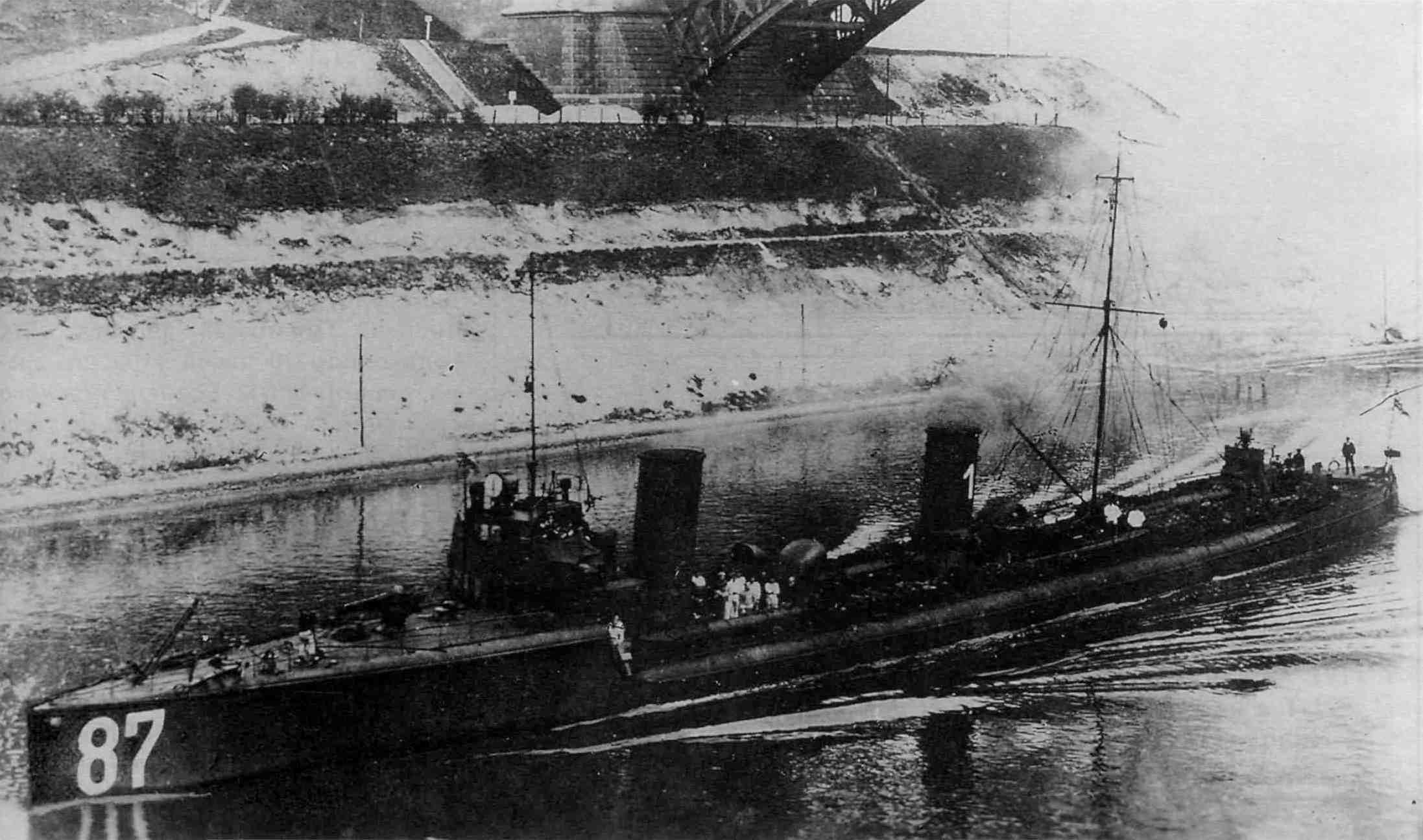
SMS V187

V187 was 73.9 metres (242 ft 5 in) long overall and 73.6 metres (241 ft 6 in) between perpendiculars, with a beam of 7.9 metres (25 ft 11 in) and a draught of 3.1 metres (10 ft 2 in). The ship displaced 666 tonnes (655 long tons) design and 775 tonnes (763 long tons) deep load. The V186 and G192 groups of torpedo boats had their forecastles cut back to allow their forward pair of torpedo tubes to fire directly ahead, but this made the ships very wet in high seas, and V187 was modified with the forecastle lengthened and the forward set of torpedo tubes moved aft of the forecastle break and the ship's bridge.

Three coal-fired and one oil-fired water-tube boiler fed steam at a pressure of 18.5 standard atmospheres (272 psi) to two sets of direct-drive steam turbines. The ship's machinery was rated at 18,000 PS (18,000 shp; 13,000 kW) giving a design speed of 32 knots (37 mph; 59 km/h), with members of the class reaching a speed of 33.5 knots (38.6 mph; 62.0 km/h) during sea trials. 136 to ns of coal and 67 tons of oil fuel were carried, giving an endurance of 2,360 nautical miles (2,720 mi; 4,370 km) at 12 knots (14 mph; 22 km/h), 1,250 nautical miles (1,440 mi; 2,320 km) at 17 knots (20 mph; 31 km/h) or 480 nautical miles (550 mi; 890 km) at 30 knots (35 mph; 56 km/h).

The ship was armed with two 8.8 cm L/45 guns, (Note: Both Conway's All The World's Fighting Ships and Jane's Fighting Ships claim L/30 guns were fitted.) one on the Forecastle and one aft. Four single 50 cm (19.7 in) torpedo tubes were fitted, with two forward, one between the ship's two funnels, and one aft of the funnels. The ship had a crew of 84 officers and men.

V187 was laid down at AG Vulcan's Stettin shipyard as Yard number 305 and was launched on 11 January 1911 and completed on 4 May 1911.

== Service ==
On commissioning, V187 joined I Torpedo Flotilla as leader, and remained the leader of I Flotilla in 1914.

=== First World War ===
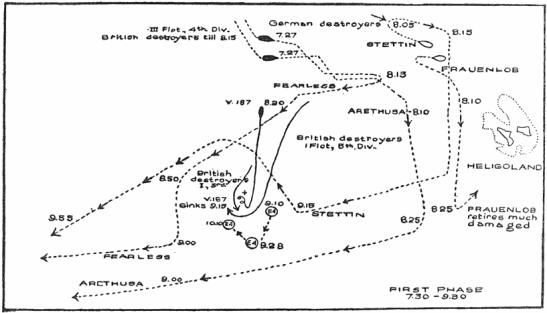
Movement of ships during first phase of Battle of Heligoland Bight, including sinking of V187

Movement and actions of V187 including sinking (German perspective)

On 28 August 1914, the British Harwich Force, supported by light cruisers and battlecruisers of the Grand Fleet, carried out a raid towards Heligoland with the intention of destroying patrolling German torpedo boats. The German defensive patrols around Heligoland consisted of one flotilla (I Torpedo Flotilla) of 12 modern torpedo boats forming an outer patrol line about 25 nautical miles (29 mi; 46 km) North and West of Heligoland, with an inner line of older torpedo boats of the 3rd Minesweeping Division at about 12 nautical miles (14 mi; 22 km). Four German light cruisers and another flotilla of torpedo boats (V Torpedo Boat Flotilla) was in the vicinity of Heligoland. V187, the leader of I Torpedo Boat Flotilla, formed part of the outer screen of torpedo boats. At about 06:00 on 28 August, G194, another member of the outer screen reported spotting the periscope of a submarine. As a result, V Flotilla was ordered out to hunt the hostile submarine. At 07:57 G194 was fired on by British warships, and was soon retreating towards Heligoland, pursued by four British destroyers. V Flotilla and the old torpedo boats of the 3rd Minesweeping Division also came under British fire, and were only saved by the intervention of the German cruisers Stettin and Frauenlob, with the torpedo boats V1, D8 and T33 damaged.

V187 headed eastwards towards Heligoland in poor visibility when she encountered four British destroyers (Goshawk, Lizard, Lapwing and Phoenix) coming from the east at about 09:25 hr, and turned southwards towards the Jade estuary with the four destroyers in pursuit. Two British light cruisers, Nottingham and Lowestoft, were sighted to the West, on a course to intercept V187, and the torpedo boat reversed course away from the cruisers back towards the destroyers. V187 managed to dash past the four British destroyers without damage, but then found a second division of four destroyers (Ferret, Forester, Druid and Defender) ahead. Trapped between two groups of destroyers, V187 was taken under heavy fire at close range which disabled the ship's machinery, bringing the blazing torpedo boat to a standstill, and causing her to cease fire. The British destroyers lowered boats to rescue V187's crew, but V187's crew, believing that the British were attempting to board the torpedo boat, fired on Goshawk. The British destroyers then re-opened fire on V187 which sank at about 10:10 hr. The boats of the British destroyers started to pick up V187's crew, but these rescue operations were interrupted by the arrival of the German cruiser Stettin. Two of Defender's boats had to be left behind, carrying 28 survivors of V187's crew and 10 British sailors. Later in the day, the British submarine E4 surfaced by the two boats. She took off the British sailors and three of the Germans, but had no room for the remaining members of V187's crew, and so gave them food and water and a course for Heligoland. 24 of V187's crew were killed, with 14 wounded and 33 taken prisoner by the British.
