= HMS Liberty (1913) =

Early 20th-century Royal Navy destroyer

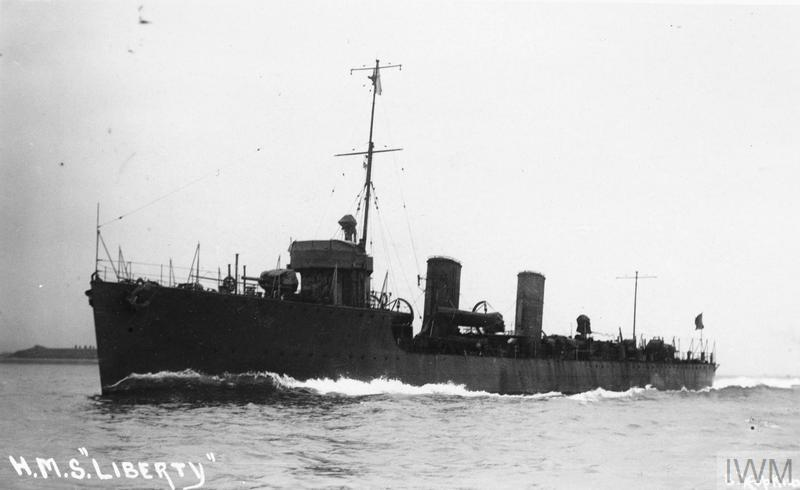
- Liberty

History

United Kingdom
- Name: HMS Liberty
- Builder: J. Samuel White, East Cowes
- Yard number: 1391
- Laid down: 31 August 1912
- Launched: 15 September 1913
- Out of service: 5 November 1921
- Fate: Broken up

General characteristics (as built)
- Class & type: Laforey-class destroyer
- Displacement: 965 long tons (980 t) (normal); 1,150 long tons (1,170 t) (deep load)
- Length: 268 ft 8 in (82 m) (o/a)
- Beam: 27 ft 8 in (8 m)
- Draught: 10 ft 6 in (3 m)
- Installed power: 3 White-Forster boilers, 24,500 shp (18,300 kW); 2 geared Parsons steam turbines, 24,500 shp (18,300 kW)
- Propulsion: Parsons steam turbines, 2 shafts
- Speed: 29 knots (33 mph; 54 km/h)
- Range: 1,720 nmi (3,185 km) at 15 kn (28 km/h)
- Complement: 73
- Armament: 3 × single QF 4-inch (102 mm) Mark IV guns; 1 × single 7.7 mm (0.3 in) Maxim gun; 2 × twin 21 in (533 mm) torpedo tubes

HMS Liberty was a Laforey-class destroyer that served with the Royal Navy during the First World War. Launched on 15 September 1913 as HMS Rosalind, the ship was renamed on 30 September under an Admiralty order to become one of the first alphabetical class destroyers. On commissioning, the vessel joined the Third Destroyer Flotilla and operated as part of the Harwich Force. During Battle of Heligoland Bight, Liberty engaged with the German torpedo boats G194 and G196, and scored two hits on the cruiser Mainz. On 8 February 1917, the destroyer rammed and sank the German submarine UC-46. The vessel also played a minor role in the battles of Dogger Bank, Dover Strait and Jutland, as well as acting as a convoy escort and patrolling the Dover Barrage. With the cessation of hostilities, the ship was placed in reserve and sold to be broken up on 5 November 1921.

== Design and development ==
Liberty was one of twenty-two L- or Laforey-class destroyers built for the Royal Navy. The design followed the preceding Acasta-class but with improved seakeeping properties and armament, including twice the number of torpedo tubes. The vessel was one of the last pre-war destroyers built by J Samuel White for the British Admiralty, constructed alongside the similar Laurel.

The destroyer had a length overall of 268 feet 8 inches (82 m), a beam of 27 feet 8 inches (8 m) and a draught of 10 feet 6 inches (3 m). Displacement was 965 long tons (980 t) normal and 1,150 long tons (1,170 t) deep load. Power was provided by three White-Forster boilers feeding two Parsons steam turbines rated at 24,500 shaft horsepower (18,300 kW) and driving two shafts, to give a design speed of 29 knots (54 km/h; 33 mph). Two funnels were fitted. A total of 268 long tons (272 t) of oil was carried, giving a design range of 1,720 nautical miles (3,190 km; 1,980 mi) at 15 knots (28 km/h; 17 mph). Fuel consumption was 51.33 long tons (52.15 t) of oil in 24 hours during test. The ship's complement was 73 officers and ratings.

Armament consisted of three QF 4 in (102 mm) Mk IV guns on the ship's centreline, with one on the forecastle, one aft and one between the funnels. The guns could fire a shell weighing 31 pounds (14 kg) at a muzzle velocity of 2,177 feet per second (664 m/s). One single 7.7 mm (0.3 in) Maxim gun was carried. A single 2-pounder 40 mm (2 in) "pom-pom" anti-aircraft gun was later added. Torpedo armament consisted of two twin mounts for 21 in (533 mm) torpedoes mounted aft. Capacity to lay four Vickers Elia Mk.4 mines was included, but the facility was never used.

== Construction and career ==
Liberty was laid down by J. Samuel White at East Cowes on the Isle of Wight on 31 August 1912 with the yard number 1391. The ship was launched on 15 September 1913. Originally named Rosalind in honour of the heroine of the play As You Like It, Liberty was renamed by Admiralty order on 30 September 1913. Built under the 1912–1913 Programme as part of a class named after characters in Shakespeare's plays and the Waverley novels by Sir Walter Scott, the destroyer joined what was to be the first alphabetical class, with each successive class of destroyers named after a letter of the alphabet.

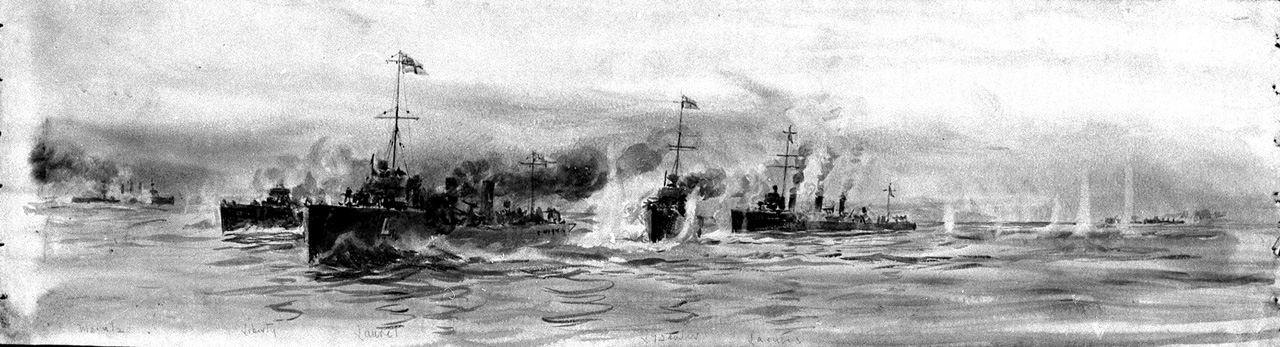
Liberty and the other destroyers of the Fourth Division under fire from Maintz during the Battle of Heligoland Bight

On commissioning, Liberty joined the Third Destroyer Flotilla as part of the Harwich Force. After the British declaration of war and the start of the First World War on 4 August 1914, the flotilla was tasked with harassing the Imperial German Navy and on 26 August was ordered to attack German torpedo boats on their patrol as part of a large Royal Navy fleet in what was to be the Battle of Heligoland Bight. The following day, Liberty was part of the Fourth Division, which included fellow L-class destroyers Laertes, Laurel and Lysander, when the German torpedo boat G194 was sighted. The destroyers set off at speed in pursuit, engaging with G194 and G196, and soon encountering the German 5th Flotilla. Liberty was second in the line when their pursuit brought them to the light cruiser Mainz and almost immediately took a hit from the larger vessel that destroyed the bridge and killed the ship's commander, Nigel K. W. Barttelot. The destroyer, in turn, claimed two hits against the German ship. Damaged, the destroyer took no further part in the action, but watched as the British forces overwhelmed the German cruiser. However, at the end, after the wounded were transferred to other ships in the British fleet, Liberty was able to return to Harwich without assistance and was soon repaired.

After returning to service, the destroyer remained stationed at Harwich defending the Strait of Dover. On 23 January 1915, the destroyer led the Second Division of the Third Flotilla during the Battle of Dogger Bank. The Flotilla was incapable of keeping sufficient speed to engage in the battle, which was left to newer and faster M-class destroyers. The ship did, however, rescue the destroyer that led into the fray, Meteor, which had been heavily damaged attacking the German armoured cruiser Blücher, towing the vessel back to Britain. For the remainder of the year, and into the next, the vessel remained at Harwich.

On 31 May 1916, as part of the Ninth Destroyer Flotilla, Liberty was one of a small contingent from the Harwich Force that took part in the Battle of Jutland. The destroyer, along with sisterships Landrail, Laurel and Lydiard, were to provide cover to the British battlecruisers of the First Battlecruiser Squadron. In this case, the flotilla was in the centre of the action but again failed to engage the German battle fleet in the confusion of the battle, with Liberty failing even to spot the enemy ships. Later that year, on 26 October, the destroyer was part of a four ship flotilla sent to defend the Dover Barrage in the Battle of Dover Strait, but saw no action at the time.

The destroyer had more success on 8 February the following year. While patrolling the Barrage, shortly after 03:00, Liberty spotted the German minelaying submarine UC-46 surface ahead. The destroyer swiftly opened fire and sped forward, ramming the German ship ahead of the conning tower at 24 kn (44 km/h; 28 mph). The German vessel sank with no survivors. In addition to these actions, Liberty was also deployed as an occasional convoy escort. The ship was subsequently redeployed to the Fourth Destroyer Flotilla based at Devonport.

After the Armistice of 11 November 1918 that ended the war, the Royal Navy returned to a peacetime level of strength and both the number of ships and personnel needed to be reduced to save money. Liberty was initially placed in reserve at the Nore alongside over sixty other destroyers. On 5 November 1921, the vessel was sold and broken up for scrap.

== Pennant numbers ==
Pennant number	Date
H81	December 1914
H57	January 1918
G99	January 1919
