= HMS Laurel (1913) =

British Laforey-class destroyer

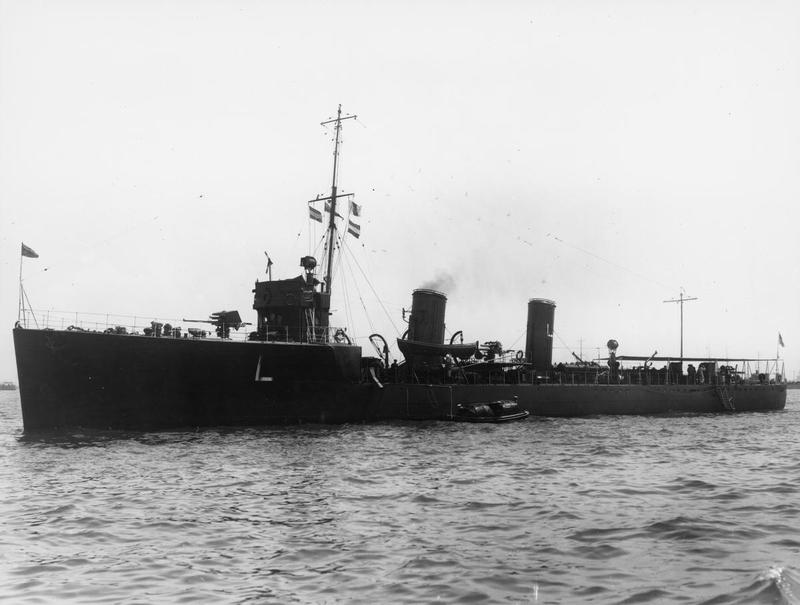
- HMS Laurel at anchor

History

United Kingdom
- Name: HMS Laurel
- Builder: J. Samuel White, East Cowes
- Yard number: 1390
- Laid down: 17 August 1912
- Launched: 6 May 1913
- Decommissioned: 1 November 1921
- Fate: Broken up

General characteristics (as built)
- Class & type: Laforey-class destroyer
- Displacement: 965 long tons (980 t) (normal); 1,150 long tons (1,170 t) (deep load)
- Length: 268 ft 8 in (81.9 m) (o/a)
- Beam: 27 ft 8 in (8.43 m)
- Draught: 10 ft 6 in (3.20 m)
- Installed power: 3 White-Forster boilers, 24,500 shp (18,300 kW)
- Propulsion: Parsons steam turbines, 2 shafts
- Speed: 29 knots (33.4 mph; 53.7 km/h)
- Range: 1,720 nmi (3,190 km) at 15 kn (28 km/h)
- Complement: 73
- Armament: 3 × single QF 4-inch (102 mm) Mark IV guns; 1 × single 7.7 mm (0.3 in) Maxim gun; 2 × twin 21 in (533 mm) torpedo tubes

HMS Laurel was a Laforey-class destroyer which served with the Royal Navy. Launched on 6 May 1913 as HMS Redgauntlet, the ship was renamed on 30 September under an Admiralty order to become one of the first alphabetical class destroyers. On commissioning, the vessel joined the 3rd Destroyer Flotilla and operated as part of the Harwich Force during the First World War. During Battle of Heligoland Bight, Laurel led a flotilla that pursued German torpedo boats, engaging with G194 and G196, and was damaged in action with the cruiser Mainz. The vessel also played a minor role in the Battles of Dogger Bank, Dover Strait and Jutland. With the cessation of hostilities, the ship was placed in reserve and scrapped on 1 November 1921.

== Design and development ==
Laurel was one of twenty two L- or Laforey-class destroyers built for the Royal Navy. The design followed the preceding Acasta-class but with improved seakeeping properties and armament, including twice the number of torpedo tubes. The vessel was one of the last pre-war destroyers constructed by J Samuel White for the British Admiralty, built alongside the similar Liberty.

The destroyer had a length overall of 268 feet 8 inches (81.89 m), a beam of 27 feet 8 inches (8.43 m) and a draught of 10 feet 6 inches (3.20 m).Displacement was 965 long tons (980 t) normal and 1,150 long tons (1,170 t) deep load. Power was provided by three White-Forster boilers feeding two Parsons steam turbines rated at 24,500 shaft horsepower (18,300 kW) and driving two shafts, to give a design speed of 29 knots (54 km/h; 33 mph). Two funnels were fitted. A total of 268 long tons (272 t) of oil was carried, giving a design range of 3,450 nautical miles (6,390 km; 3,970 mi) at 15 knots (28 km/h; 17 mph). Fuel consumption was 51.33 long tons (52.15 t) of oil in 24 hours during test. The ship's complement was 73 officers and ratings.

Armament consisted of three QF 4 in (102 mm) Mk IV guns on the ship's centreline, with one on the forecastle, one aft and one between the funnels. The guns could fire a shell weighing 31 pounds (14 kg) at a muzzle velocity of 2,177 feet per second (664 m/s). One single 7.7 mm (0.3 in) Maxim gun was carried. A single 2-pounder 40 mm (2 in) "pom-pom" anti-aircraft gun was later added. Torpedo armament consisted of two twin mounts for 21 in (533 mm) torpedoes mounted aft. Capacity to lay four Vickers Elia Mk.4 mines was included, but the facility was never used.

== Construction and career ==
Laurel was laid down by J. Samuel White at East Cowes on the Isle of Wight on 17 August 1912 with the yard number 1390. The ship was launched on 6 May 1913. Originally launched as Redgauntlet, Laurel was renamed by Admiralty order on 30 September 1913. Built under the 1912–1913 Programme as part of a class named after characters in Shakespeare’s plays and the Waverley novels by Sir Walter Scott, the destroyer joined what was to be the first alphabetical class.

On commissioning, Laurel joined the 3rd Destroyer Flotilla as part of the Harwich Force. At the start of the First World War on 4 August 1914, the flotilla was tasked with harassing the Imperial German Navy and on 26 August 1914 was ordered to attack German torpedo boats on their patrol as part of a large Royal Navy fleet in what was to be the Battle of Heligoland Bight.

On 27 August 1914, Laurel was leading the Fourth Division, which included sisterships Laertes, Liberty and Lysander, when the German torpedo boat G194 was sighted. Laurel set off at speed in pursuit, engaging with G194 and G196 and soon encountering the German Fifth Flotilla. In the confusion that followed, Laurel continued to lead the pursuit, attacking a number of German torpedo boats and straying far from the main British fleet. This position meant that, when the light cruiser Mainz arrived to reinforce the German forces, the first salvo landed on Laurel. Within two shots, the damage became critical. The central gun was hit, the resulting explosion blowing away half the funnel and wounding the captain, F. F. Rose. The smoke and steam pouring out from the wounded destroyer obscured the cruiser's aim and Laurel was able to escape, covered by other British ships, which ultimately sank the German cruiser. The destroyer was able to regain steam and returned to Harwich for repairs at 10 knots (19 km/h; 12 mph), assisted by the protected cruiser Amethyst.

After returning to service, the destroyer remained stationed at Harwich defending the Strait of Dover. On 23 January 1915, the destroyer led the Second Division of the Third Flotilla during the Battle of Dogger Bank. The Flotilla was unable to keep sufficient speed to engage in the battle, which was left to newer and faster M-class destroyers. At the Battle of Jutland, the destroyer, along with sisterships Landrail, Liberty and Lydiard, formed part of a flotilla which were to provide cover to the British battlecruisers. In this case, the flotilla was in the centre of the action but again failed to engage the German battle fleet in the confusion of the battle. However, the destroyer did rescue seventeen survivors from the battlecruiser Queen Mary.

On 5 September 1916, Lark and Laurel were sent to the English Channel to escort Princess Victoria, which was carrying a load of gold bullion from Cherbourg to Portsmouth. On 26 October 1916, the destroyer was part of a four ship flotilla sent to defend the Dover Barrage in the Battle of Dover Strait. The destroyer saw no action at the time, nor on subsequent patrol on 25 February 1917 despite the presence of German warships nearby. The destroyer also sortied on 19 May 1917 to escort the first convoy to journey from Gibraltar. The convoy was a success, with no submarine attacks, and helped justify the convoy system.

The destroyer was subsequently redeployed to the 4th Destroyer Flotilla based at Devonport. After the Armistice of 11 November 1918 that ended the war, the Royal Navy returned to a peacetime level of strength and both the number of ships and personnel needed to be reduced to save money. Laurel was initially placed in reserve at Nore alongside over sixty other destroyers. On 1 November 1921, the vessel was sold and broken up for scrap.

== Pennant numbers ==
Pennant number	Date
H.91	December 1914
H.51	January 1918
G.98	January 1919
