= HMS Laertes (1913) =

Destroyer of the Royal Navy

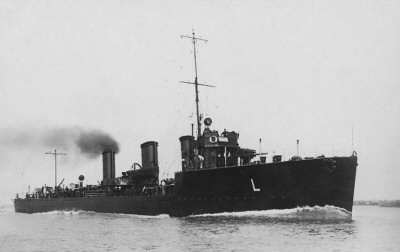
- HMS Laertes

History

United Kingdom
- Name: HMS Laertes
- Builder: Swan, Hunter & Wigham Richardson, Wallsend
- Launched: 5 June 1913, as HMS Sarpedon
- Renamed: HMS Laertes, 30 September 1913
- Fate: Sold for scrapping, 1 December 1921

General characteristics
- Class & type: Laforey-class destroyer
- Displacement: 965–1,010 long tons (980–1,026 t)
- Length: 268 ft 10 in (81.94 m) o/a
- Beam: 27 ft 8 in (8.43 m)
- Draught: 10 ft 6 in (3.20 m)
- Installed power: 24,500 shp (18,300 kW); 4 × Yarrow boilers
- Propulsion: 2 Shafts; 2 steam turbines
- Speed: 29 knots (54 km/h; 33 mph)
- Range: 1,720 nmi (3,190 km; 1,980 mi) at 15 knots (28 km/h; 17 mph)
- Complement: 74
- Armament: 3 × QF 4-inch (102 mm) Mark IV guns; 2 × QF 2-pounder (40 mm) "pom-pom" anti-aircraft guns; 2 × twin 21-inch (533 mm) torpedo tubes

HMS Laertes was a Laforey-class destroyer built for the Royal Navy during the 1910s.

== Description ==
The Laforey class were improved and faster versions of the preceding Acasta class. They displaced 965–1,010 long tons (980–1,026 t). The ships had an overall length of 268 feet 10 inches (81.9 m), a beam of 27 feet 8 inches (8.4 m) and a draught of 10 feet 6 inches (3.2 m). Laertes was powered by two Parsons direct-drive steam turbines, each driving one propeller shaft, using steam provided by four Yarrow boilers. The turbines developed a total of 24,500 shaft horsepower (18,300 kW) and gave a maximum speed of 29 knots (54 km/h; 33 mph). The ships carried a maximum of 280 long tons (280 t) of fuel oil that gave them a range of 1,750 nautical miles (3,240 km; 2,010 mi) at 15 knots (28 km/h; 17 mph). The ships' complement was 74 officers and ratings.

The ships were armed with three single QF 4-inch (102 mm) Mark IV guns and two QF 1.5-pounder (37 mm) anti-aircraft guns. These latter guns were later replaced by a pair of QF 2-pounder (40 mm) "pom-pom" anti-aircraft guns. The ships were also fitted with two above-water twin mounts for 21-inch (533 mm) torpedoes.

== Construction and service ==
The ship was launched from the yards of Swan, Hunter & Wigham Richardson, Wallsend, on 5 June 1913 under the name HMS Sarpedon. The destroyer was renamed HMS Laertes on 30 September 1913. She possessed three 4-inch guns and four torpedo tubes, and was designed to operate in British coastal waters against enemy surface and submarine shipping. Laertes became part of the 3rd Destroyer Flotilla based at Harwich. She took part in the Battle of Heligoland Bight on 28 August 1914, where she was seriously damaged suffering four shell strikes. The most serious struck the boiler room, temporarily cutting off all steam supplies to the engines leaving the ship motionless. Another shot destroyed the middle funnel, while a gun was also hit. While Laertes was seriously damaged and stopped in the water, Lapwing went to her aid under heavy fire. Lieutenant Commander Gye manoeuvred to pass a tow, but in getting underway the towing hawser parted. Laertes was saved only by the arrival of the battle cruiser Lion. The ship managed to restore some power but had to be towed back to England.

Lapwing attempts to take Laertes in tow during the Battle of Heligoland Bight.

Laertes was one of the destroyers of the Harwich squadron which attempted to head off attacking German ships during the Bombardment of Yarmouth and Lowestoft on 25 April 1916. The ship was hit by shellfire damaging the boiler room, and would most likely have sunk except for the actions of Stoker Ernest Clarke. Clarke later died from burns received while saving the ship and was posthumously awarded the Distinguished Service Medal. Five of the crew were injured during the attack. Stoker Petty Officer Stephen Pritchard, who entered the cabin flat immediately after a shell had exploded there, and worked a fire hose, was also awarded the Distinguished Service Medal.

In 1917 Laertes was transferred to escort duties. She was sold on 1 December 1921 to Stanlee, of Dover for breaking up. She ran aground at Newhaven, East Sussex, on 8 March 1922 while under tow to the breaker's yard after her tow parted. She was later refloated and arrived at Dover on 13 March 1922 for scrapping. She was scrapped that year.

== Bibliography ==
- Colledge, J. J.; Warlow, Ben (2006) [1969]. Ships of the Royal Navy: The Complete Record of All Fighting Ships of the Royal Navy from the 15th Century to the Present (3rd Rev ed.). London: Chatham Publishing. ISBN 978-1-86176-281-8. OCLC 67375475.
- Dittmar, F.J. & Colledge, J.J. (1972). British Warships 1914–1919. Shepperton, UK: Ian Allan. ISBN 0-7110-0380-7.
- Friedman, Norman (2009). British Destroyers: From Earliest Days to the Second World War. Barnsley, UK: Seaforth Publishing. ISBN 978-1-84832-049-9.
- Gardiner, Robert & Gray, Randal (1985). Conway's All The World's Fighting Ships 1906–1921. London: Conway Maritime Press. ISBN 0-85177-245-5.
