= SMS S15 (1912) =

Torpedo boat of the Imperial German Navy

History

German Empire
- Name: S15
- Builder: Schichau-Werke, Elbing
- Launched: 23 March 1912
- Commissioned: 1 November 1912
- Fate: Mined 21 August 1917; Stricken 20 September 1917 and scrapped

General characteristics
- Displacement: 697 t (686 long tons)
- Length: 71.1 m (233 ft 3 in) oa
- Beam: 7.6 m (24 ft 11 in)
- Draft: 3.11 m (10 ft 2 in)
- Propulsion: 4× water-tube boilers; 2× steam turbines; 17,000 metric horsepower (17,000 shp; 13,000 kW)
- Speed: 32 knots (59.3 km/h; 36.8 mph)
- Range: 1,190 nmi (2,200 km; 1,370 mi) at 17 knots (31 km/h; 20 mph)
- Complement: 74 officers and sailors
- Armament: 2 x 8.8 cm (3.5 in)/30 guns; 4 x 50 cm (20 in) torpedo tubes

SMS S15 (Note: "SMS" stands for "Seiner Majestät Schiff" (German: His Majesty's Ship)) (Note: The "S" in S15 denotes the shipyard at which she was built, in this case Schichau-Werke.) was a V1-class torpedo boat of the Imperial German Navy. The ship was built by Schichau-Werke, at their Elbing shipyard, completing in 1912.

S15 served in the North Sea and English Channel during the First World War, taking part in the Battle of Jutland in 1916. She was badly damaged by a mine on 21 August 1917 and was scrapped as a result.

== Construction and design ==
In 1911, the Imperial German Navy decided to break the pattern of each year's orders of torpedo boats being a development of the previous year's designs, as it felt that they were getting too big to work for the fleet, and instead the 12 torpedo boats (six each ordered from AG Vulcan and Germaniawerft (Note: The Imperial German Navy's practice was to split a year's orders into half-flotillas of six torpedo boats from different builders, to differing detailed design.)) (the V1-class) were smaller than those ordered in recent years in order to be more manoeuvrable and so work better with the fleet. This change resulted in the numbering series for torpedo boats being restarted. The 1912 programme placed orders for a flotilla of 12 torpedo boats of similar design (S13 to S24) with Schichau-Werke. The reduction in size resulted in the ships' seaworthiness being adversely affected, however, with the 1911 and 1912 torpedo boats acquiring the disparaging nickname "Admiral Lans' cripples".

The Schichau boats were 71.5 m (234 ft 7 in) long overall and 71.0 m (232 ft 11 in) at the waterline, with a beam of 7.43 m (24 ft 5 in) and a draught of 2.77 m (9 ft 1 in). Displacement was 568 tonnes (559 long tons) normal and 695 tonnes (684 long tons) deep load. Three coal-fired and one oil-fired water-tube boilers fed steam to two direct-drive steam turbines rated at 15,700 metric horsepower (15,500 shp; 11,500 kW), giving a design speed of 32.5 knots (60.2 km/h; 37.4 mph). 108 tonnes (106 long tons) of coal and 72 tonnes (71 long tons) of oil were carried, giving a range of 1,050 nautical miles (1,940 km; 1,210 mi) at 17 knots (31 km/h; 20 mph) or 600 nautical miles (1,100 km; 690 mi) at 29 knots (54 km/h; 33 mph).

S15's armament consisted of two 8.8 cm (3.5 in) SK L/30 naval guns (Note: In Imperial German Navy gun nomenclature, the L/30 denotes the length of the gun. In this case, the L/30 gun is 30 caliber, meaning that the gun is 30 times as long as it is in diameter.) in single mounts fore and aft, together with four 50 cm (19.7 in) torpedo tubes with one reload torpedo carried. Up to 18 mines could be carried. The ship had a crew of 74 officers and other ranks. In 1916, the guns were replaced by more powerful 8.8 cm SK L/45 naval guns, and in 1917, these guns were again replaced, this time with 10.5 cm SK L/45 naval guns, while the ship's forecastle was lengthened.

S15, yard number 866, was launched at Schichau's shipyard in Elbing, East Prussia (now Elbląg in Poland) on 23 March 1912 and was commissioned on 1 November 1912.

== Service ==
S15 was a member of the 13th Half-flotilla of the 7th Torpedo boat flotilla of the German High Seas Fleet on the outbreak of war. The 7th Torpedo Boat Flotilla supported the Raid on Yarmouth on 3 November 1914 and the Raid on Scarborough, Hartlepool and Whitby on 16 December 1914. On the night of 19/20 December 1914, the two torpedo boats S22 and S23 of the 7th Flotilla stopped the Swedish steamer Argo, suspected of carrying contraband to Russia near Simrishamn on the East coast of Sweden. Argo rammed S22 and made off, ignoring a warning shot over her boxs, with the two torpedo boats not opening fire as the commanding officer was unsure whether they were in Swedish territorial waters. The Flotilla commander disagreed, arguing that Argos's hostile actions authorised the use of force, and ordered S15 and S17 to intercept Argo and to use "all means" to capture the ship. Argo was seized at Utlängan in Swedish waters, and taken to the German port of Swinemünde (now Świnoujście in Poland) but was released after a few hours. S15, as part of the 7th flotilla, was part of the High Seas Fleet when it sailed to cover the Lowestoft Raid on 24–25 April 1916.

At the Battle of Jutland on 31 May–1 June 1916, S15 was still part of the 13th Half-flotilla of the 7th Torpedo boat flotilla, operating in support of the main German battle fleet. During the night action, the 7th flotilla was ordered to search for and attack the British fleet. At about 23:00 hr CET (i.e. 22:00 hr GMT) on the night of 31 May/1 June, there was a brief confrontation between the 7th Torpedo Boat flotilla and the British 4th Destroyer Flotilla. Four German torpedo boats, including S15, each fired one torpedo at the British destroyers, while the British ships replied with gunfire, but no ships were damaged and contact was soon lost, although the two formations met again at about 23:42 CET (22:42 GMT) when S24 fired another torpedo, which also missed.

In February 1917, S15 was one of ten torpedo boats that were transferred to the German naval forces based in Flanders, arriving in Belgium on 18 February, (Note: These were the large torpedo boats S15, S18, S20, S24, G95 and G96 and the smaller A-class coastal torpedo boats A39, A40, A42 and A45.) joining the 2nd Zeebrugge half-flotilla. On the night of March 17/18 1917 the Germans launched a major raid by the Flanders-based torpedo boats against Allied defences and shipping in the English Channel. While two groups of torpedo boats, the seven ships of the 6th Flotilla and the five ships of the 1st Zeebrugge half-flotilla were to operate against the Dover Barrage, S15 led three more torpedo boats of the 2nd Zeebrugge half flotilla (Note: S15, S18, S20 and S24.) that were ordered to attack shipping on the Downs. S15's group swept past the drifters guarding the entrance to the Downs, firing at one of the drifters, the Paramount as they passed. Only a single merchant ship, the steamer SS Greypoint, which was suffering from engine problems was anchored in the Downs. S15 and S20 each fired a single torpedo at Greypoint, - S15's torpedo missed, but S20's torpedo sunk the steamer. The four torpedo boats then attacked the drifters again, damaging the Redwald before firing a few shells at Ramsgate, Broadstairs and St Peter's before withdrawing. The torpedo boats of the 6th flotilla sank the British destroyer Paragon and badly damaged the destroyer Llewellyn.

On 5 June 1917, the British Dover Patrol, supported by the Harwich Force carried out a bombardment of the port of Ostend. On the morning of that day, S15 and S20 were returning from a patrol when they encountered four light cruisers and nine destroyers of the Harwich Force. The British opened fire on the two German torpedo boats, which made for port. Four British destroyers (Satyr, Sharpshooter, Taurus and Torrent) were ordered to intercept the German ships. S20 was hit in the boiler room by a shell from one of the cruisers, immobilising her, and was sunk by the British destroyers, while S15 was hit twice, destroying one of her turbines, which cut her speed to 17 kn (20 mph; 31 km/h) and damaging her rudder, but she managed to reach the cover of German coastal defences causing the British destroyers to break off their pursuit. Four of S15's crew were killed.

On 21 August 1917, S15 was escorting minesweepers off the coast of Flanders when she was badly damaged by a mine. She was towed back to port by S24 but was stricken on 20 September 1917 and scrapped at Ghent.

== Bibliography ==
- Campbell, John (1998). Jutland: An Analysis of the Fighting. London: Conway Maritime Press. ISBN 0-85177-750-3.
- Fock, Harald (1989). Z-Vor! Internationale Entwicklung und Kriegseinsätze von Zerstörern und Torpedobooten 1914 bis 1939 (in German). Herford, Germany: Koehlers Verlagsgesellschaft mBH. ISBN 3-7822-0207-4.
- Gardiner, Robert; Gray, Randal, eds. (1985). Conway's All The World's Fighting Ships 1906–1921. London: Conway Maritime Press. ISBN 0-85177-245-5.
- Gröner, Erich; Jung, Dieter; Maass, Martin (1983). Die deutschen Kriegsschiffe 1815–1945: Band 2: Torpedoboote, Zerstörer, Schnellboote, Minensuchboote, Minenräumboote (in German). Koblenz: Bernard & Graef Verlag. ISBN 3-7637-4801-6.
- Karau, Mark K. (2014). The Naval Flank of the Western Front: The German MarineKorps Flandern 1914–1918. Barnsley, UK: Seaforth Publishing. ISBN 978-1-84832-231-8.
- Monograph No. 32: Lowestoft Raid: 24th–25th April 1916 (PDF). Naval Staff Monographs (Historical). Vol. XVI. Naval Staff, Training and Staff Duties Division. 1927.
- Monograph No. 34: Home Waters—Part VIII.: December 1916 to April 1917 (PDF). Naval Staff Monographs (Historical). Vol. XVIII. Naval Staff, Training and Staff Duties Division. 1933.
- Monograph No. 35: Home Waters—Part IX: 1st May, 1917, to 31st July, 1917 (PDF). Naval Staff Monographs (Historical). Vol. XIX. The Naval Staff, Training and Staff Duties Division. 1939.
- Newbolt, Henry (1928). Naval Operations: Volume IV. History of the Great War: Based on Official Documents. London: Longmans Green & Co.
- Rollmann, Heinrich (1929). Der Krieg in der Ostsee: Zweiter Band: Das Kreigjahr 1915. Der Krieg zur See: 1914–1918 (in German). Berlin: Verlag von E. S. Mittler und Sohn.
