= SMS S20 (1912) =

V1-class torpedo boat of the Imperial German Navy

History

Germany
- Name: S20
- Builder: Schichau-Werke, Elbing
- Launched: 4 December 1912
- Commissioned: 1 November 1913
- Fate: Sank 5 June 1917

General characteristics
- Displacement: 697 t (686 long tons)
- Length: 71.1 m (233 ft 3 in) oa
- Beam: 7.6 m (24 ft 11 in)
- Draft: 3.11 m (10 ft 2 in)
- Propulsion: 4× water-tube boilers; 2× steam turbines; 17,000 metric horsepower (17,000 shp; 13,000 kW)
- Speed: 32 knots (59.3 km/h; 36.8 mph)
- Range: 1,190 nmi (2,200 km; 1,370 mi) at 17 knots (31 km/h; 20 mph)
- Complement: 74 officers and sailors
- Armament: 2 x 8.8 cm (3.5 in)/30 guns; 4 x 50 cm (20 in) torpedo tubes

SMS S20 (Note: "SMS" stands for "Seiner Majestät Schiff" (German: His Majesty's Ship)) (Note: The "S" in S20 denotes the shipyard at which she was built, in this case Schichau-Werke.) was a V1-class torpedo boat of the Imperial German Navy. The ship was built by Schichau-Werke, at their Elbing shipyard, completing in 1913. S20 served with the German High Seas Fleet during the First World War, taking part in the Battle of Jutland in 1916 and moved to Flanders later in 1916. The ship was sunk by cruisers and destroyers of the British Harwich Force on 5 June 1917.

== Construction and design ==
In 1911, the Imperial German Navy decided to break the pattern of each year's orders of torpedo boats being a development of the previous year's designs, as it felt that they were getting too big to work for the fleet, and instead the 12 torpedo boats (six each ordered from AG Vulcan and Germaniawerft (Note: The Imperial German Navy's practice was to split a year's orders into half-flotillas of six torpedo boats from different builders, to differing detailed design.)) (the V1 class) were smaller than those ordered in recent years in order to be more manoeuvrable and so work better with the fleet. This change resulted in the numbering series for torpedo boats being restarted. The 1912 programme placed orders for a flotilla of 12 torpedo boats of similar design (S13 to S24) with Schichau-Werke. The reduction in size resulted in the ships' seaworthiness being adversely affected, however, and range being reduced, with the 1911 and 1912 torpedo boats acquiring the disparaging nickname "Admiral Lans' cripples".

The Schichau boats were 71.5 m (234 ft 7 in) long overall and 71.0 m (232 ft 11 in) at the waterline, with a beam of 7.43 m (24 ft 5 in) and a draught of 2.77 m (9 ft 1 in). Displacement was 568 tonnes (559 long tons) normal and 695 tonnes (684 long tons) deep load. Three coal-fired and one oil-fired water-tube boilers fed steam to two direct-drive steam turbines rated at 15,700 metric horsepower (15,500 shp; 11,500 kW), giving a design speed of 32.5 knots (60.2 km/h; 37.4 mph). 108 tonnes (106 long tons) of coal and 72 tonnes (71 long tons) of oil were carried, giving a range of 1,050 nautical miles (1,940 km; 1,210 mi) at 17 knots (31 km/h; 20 mph) or 600 nautical miles (1,100 km; 690 mi) at 29 knots (54 km/h; 33 mph).

S20's armament consisted of two 8.8 cm (3.5 in) SK L/30 naval guns (Note: In Imperial German Navy gun nomenclature, the L/30 denotes the length of the gun. In this case, the L/30 gun is 30 caliber, meaning that the gun is 30 times as long as it is in diameter.) in single mounts fore and aft, together with four 50 cm (19.7 in) torpedo tubes with one reload torpedo carried. Up to 18 mines could be carried. The ship had a crew of 74 officers and other ranks. In 1916, the guns were replaced by more powerful 8.8 cm SK L/45 naval guns, and in 1917 the ship was again rearmed, with two 10.5 cm SK L/45 naval guns replacing the 8.8cm guns, with the ship's forecastle being lengthened in 1916–17.

S20, yard number 871, was launched at Schichau's shipyard in Elbing, East Prussia (now Elbląg in Poland) on 4 December 1912 and was commissioned on 1 November 1913.

== Service ==
In May 1914, S20 was a member of the 14th half-flotilla of the 7th Torpedo boat Flotilla, and remained part of the 14th half-flotilla at the outbreak of the First World War in August 1914. The 7th Torpedo Boat Flotilla supported the Raid on Yarmouth on 3 November 1914 and the Raid on Scarborough, Hartlepool and Whitby on 16 December 1914. The flotilla continued to support the High Seas Fleet in 1915, sortieing into the German Bight with the 5th and 9th Flotilla on 19/20 January and escorting a sortie of the fleet's battleships to off Terschelling on 29/30 March. In May 1915, in support of the Gorlice–Tarnów offensive on the Eastern Front, Germany launched an attack against Libau (now Liepāja) in Latvia, with naval support from the German navy. The 14th half-flotilla, (Note: S20, S19, S22 and S23) including S20, formed part of a force of four light cruisers and 21 torpedo boats detached from the High Seas Fleet in support of the Baltic operations. They were used to prevent interference by the Russian navy with the operations, patrolling between Ösel and Gotska Sandön and between Gotska Sandön and the Swedish coast. S20 and sister ship S23 operated in support of the light cruisers of IV Scouting Group on 7 May, and on 8 May, S20 and S23 were attacked by the British submarine E9, with S20 spotting the submarine's conning tower, but dense fog caused contact to be lost before S20 could open fire. The force detached from the High Seas Fleet was recalled to the North Sea soon after Libau was captured on 8 May.

S20, as part of the 7th flotilla, was part of the High Seas Fleet when it sailed to cover the Lowestoft Raid on 24–25 April 1916. At the Battle of Jutland on 31 May–1 June 1916, S20 was still part of the 13th Half-flotilla of the 7th Torpedo boat flotilla, operating in support of the main German battle fleet. During the night action, the 7th flotilla was ordered to search for and attack the British fleet, being allocated the sector to the south-east of the German fleet. The speed of the ships of the 7th flotilla, (and those of the 5th Flotilla, patrolling the adjacent sector) was limited to less than 17 kn (20 mph; 31 km/h) by the need to minimise the production of smoke and sparks which would give their location away in any confrontation at night, and by the tiredness of their stokers, as the ships had been operating at high speeds for most of the preceding day. As the British fleet had a night cruising speed of 17 knots, this would limit the 7th Flotilla's effectiveness.

In February 1917, S20 was one of six large torpedo boat and four small A-II-class torpedo boats that were ordered to reinforce the German naval forces based in Flanders. The ten torpedo boats (Note: S20, S15, S18, S24, G95, G96, A39, A40, A42 and A45) arrived at Zeebrugge on 18 February 1917, with S20 joining the 2nd Zeebrugge half-flotilla. On 25 February 1917, Admiral Ludwig von Schröder, commander of German naval forces in Flanders, took advantage of the increased strength of the Flanders-based surface forces to order an attack against shipping in the English Channel and southern North Sea. While six torpedo boats were sent to attack the patrol boats of the Dover Barrage and another five sent against shipping near the North Foreland lightship, S20, together with S18 and S24 was sent to attack shipping on passage between Britain and the Netherlands. The operation was not a success, with no shipping encountered. On the night of 17/18 March, a second attack on the Channel was launched. S20, with three other ships of the 2nd Zeebrugge half-flotilla (S15, S18 and S24), were ordered to attack shipping in the Downs, while two other groups of torpedo boats attacked the Dover Barrage patrols. The Zeebrugge half-flotilla fired on one of the drifters guarding the entrance to the Downs, Paramount as they entered the Downs, and then found a single merchant ship, the steamer SS Greypoint, which was at anchor because it was suffering from engine problems and unable to follow standing orders to find a safer anchorage. S20 sank Greypoint before the group again clashed with the drifters guarding the downs, damaging the Redwald and briefly shelling coastal targets in Kent before withdrawing. The other groups sank the British destroyer Paragon and damaged the destroyer Llewellyn.

The next raid on the Channel was on the night of 20/21 April, when S20 was one of 15 torpedo boats to be sent out in three groups. While two of the groups, including the one containing S20 returned to port without action, the third group was caught by British destroyers, with G42 and G85 sunk. On the night of 26/27 April, S20 took part in a raid by 15 Flanders-based torpedo boats in 3 groups with the intention of attacking shipping off the Thames Estuary. No shipping was found, and instead Margate, Broadstairs and Ramsgate were shelled, killing two people, wounding three more and damaging several houses.

In the early morning of 5 June, S20 and S15 were returning from a patrol when they encountered four light cruisers (Centaur, Canterbury, Conquest and Concord), the destroyer leader Lightfoot and eight destroyers of the Harwich Force, which were providing cover for a bombardment of Ostend by monitors of the Dover Patrol. Heavily outnumbered and outgunned, the two German torpedo boats made for Zeebrugge and the protection of German coastal defences. A division of four British destroyers (Satyr, Sharpshooter, Taurus and Torrent) were ordered to pursue the torpedo boats. S20 was hit in the boiler room by one of the cruisers, immobilising S20 and killing her captain. The British destroyers sank S20, with 49 of her crew killed. S15, although hit three times, managed to make the cover of the coastal defences, causing the British to break off the pursuit.

The Nazi German destroyer Erich Giese was named after S20's commanding officer killed during S20's loss.

== Bibliography ==
- Campbell, John (1998). Jutland: An Analysis of the Fighting. London: Conway Maritime Press. ISBN 0-85177-750-3.
- Fock, Harald (1981). Schwarze Gesellen: Band 2: Zerstörer bis 1914 (in German). Herford, Germany: Koelers Verlagsgesellschaft mBH. ISBN 3-7822-0206-6.
- Fock, Harald (1989). Z-Vor! Internationale Entwicklung und Kriegseinsätze von Zerstörern und Torpedobooten 1914 bis 1939 (in German). Herford, Germany: Koehlers Verlagsgesellschaft mBH. ISBN 3-7822-0207-4.
- Gardiner, Robert; Gray, Randal, eds. (1985). Conway's All The World's Fighting Ships 1906–1921. London: Conway Maritime Press. ISBN 0-85177-245-5.
- Gröner, Erich; Jung, Dieter; Maass, Martin (1983). Die deutschen Kriegsschiffe 1815–1945: Band 2: Torpedoboote, Zerstörer, Schnellboote, Minensuchboote, Minenräumboote (in German). Koblenz: Bernard & Graef Verlag. ISBN 3-7637-4801-6.
- Halpern, Paul G. (1994). A Naval History of World War I. London: UCL Press. ISBN 1-85728-498-4.
- Karau, Mark K. (2014). The Naval Flank of the Western Front: The German MarineKorps Flandern 1914–1918. Barnsley, UK: Seaforth Publishing. ISBN 978-1-84832-231-8.
- Koop, Gerhard; Schmolke, Klaus-Peter (2014). German Destroyers of World War II. Barnsley, UK: Seaforth Publishing. ISBN 978-1-84832-193-9.
- Monograph No. 32: Lowestoft Raid: 24th–25th April 1916 (PDF). Naval Staff Monographs (Historical). Vol. XVI. Naval Staff, Training and Staff Duties Division. 1927.
- Monograph No. 34: Home Waters—Part VIII.: December 1916 to April 1917 (PDF). Naval Staff Monographs (Historical). Vol. XVIII. Naval Staff, Training and Staff Duties Division. 1933.
- Monograph No. 35: Home Waters—Part IX: 1st May, 1917, to 31st July, 1917 (PDF). Naval Staff Monographs (Historical). Vol. XIX. The Naval Staff, Training and Staff Duties Division. 1939.
- Newbolt, Henry (1928). Naval Operations: Volume IV. History of the Great War: Based on Official Documents. London: Longmans Green & Co.
- Newbolt, Henry (1931). Naval Operations: Vol. V. History of the Great War: Based on Official Documents. London: Longmans Green. OCLC 220475309.
- Rangelist der Kaiserlich Deutschen Marine für Das Jahr 1914 (in German). Berlin: Ernst Siegfried Mittler und Sohn. 1914 – via Heinrich Hein Universität Düsseldorf.
- Rollmann, Heinrich (1929). Der Krieg in der Ostsee: Zweiter Band: Das Kreigjahr 1915. Der Krieg zur See: 1914–1918 (in German). Berlin: Verlag von E. S. Mittler und Sohn.
- Tarrant, V. E. (1997). Jutland: The German Perspective. London: Arms & Armour Press. ISBN 1-85409-442-4.
