= SMS S21 =

SMS S21 refers to two torpedo boats built by the German Kaiserliche Marine (Imperial Navy):

- SMS S21 (1885), a S7-class torpedo boat launched in 1885 and sunk in an accidental collision in 1911
- SMS S21 (1913), a V1-class torpedo boat launched in 1913 and sunk in an accidental collision in 1915
