= SMS S16 (1912) =

Torpedo boat of the Imperial German Navy

History

German Empire
- Name: S16
- Builder: Schichau-Werke, Elbing
- Launched: 23 April 1912
- Commissioned: 1 October 1912
- Fate: Mined 20 January 1918

General characteristics
- Displacement: 697 t (686 long tons)
- Length: 71.1 m (233 ft 3 in) oa
- Beam: 7.6 m (24 ft 11 in)
- Draft: 3.11 m (10 ft 2 in)
- Propulsion: 4× water-tube boilers; 2× steam turbines; 17,000 metric horsepower (17,000 shp; 13,000 kW)
- Speed: 32 knots (59.3 km/h; 36.8 mph)
- Range: 1,190 nmi (2,200 km; 1,370 mi) at 17 knots (31 km/h; 20 mph)
- Complement: 74 officers and sailors
- Armament: 2 x 8.8 cm (3.5 in)/30 guns; 4 x 50 cm (20 in) torpedo tubes

SMS S16 (Note: "SMS" stands for "Seiner Majestät Schiff" (German: His Majesty's Ship)) (Note: The "S" in S16 denotes the shipyard at which she was built, in this case Schichau-Werke.) was a V1-class torpedo boat of the Imperial German Navy. The ship was built by Schichau-Werke, at their Elbing shipyard, completing in 1912. S16 served with the German High Seas Fleet during the First World War, taking part in the Battle of Jutland in 1916. She was sunk by a mine on 20 January 1918.

== Construction and design ==
In 1911, the Imperial German Navy decided to break the pattern of each year's orders of torpedo boats being a development of the previous year's designs, as it felt that they were getting too big to work for the fleet, and instead the 12 torpedo boats (six each ordered from AG Vulcan and Germaniawerft (Note: The Imperial German Navy's practice was to split a year's orders into half-flotillas of six torpedo boats from different builders, to differing detailed design.)) (the V1-class) were smaller than those ordered in recent years in order to be more manoeuvrable and so work better with the fleet. This change resulted in the numbering series for torpedo boats being restarted. The 1912 programme placed orders for a flotilla of 12 torpedo boats of similar design (S13 to S24) with Schichau-Werke. The reduction in size resulted in the ships' seaworthiness being adversely affected, however, with the 1911 and 1912 torpedo boats acquiring the disparaging nickname "Admiral Lans' cripples".

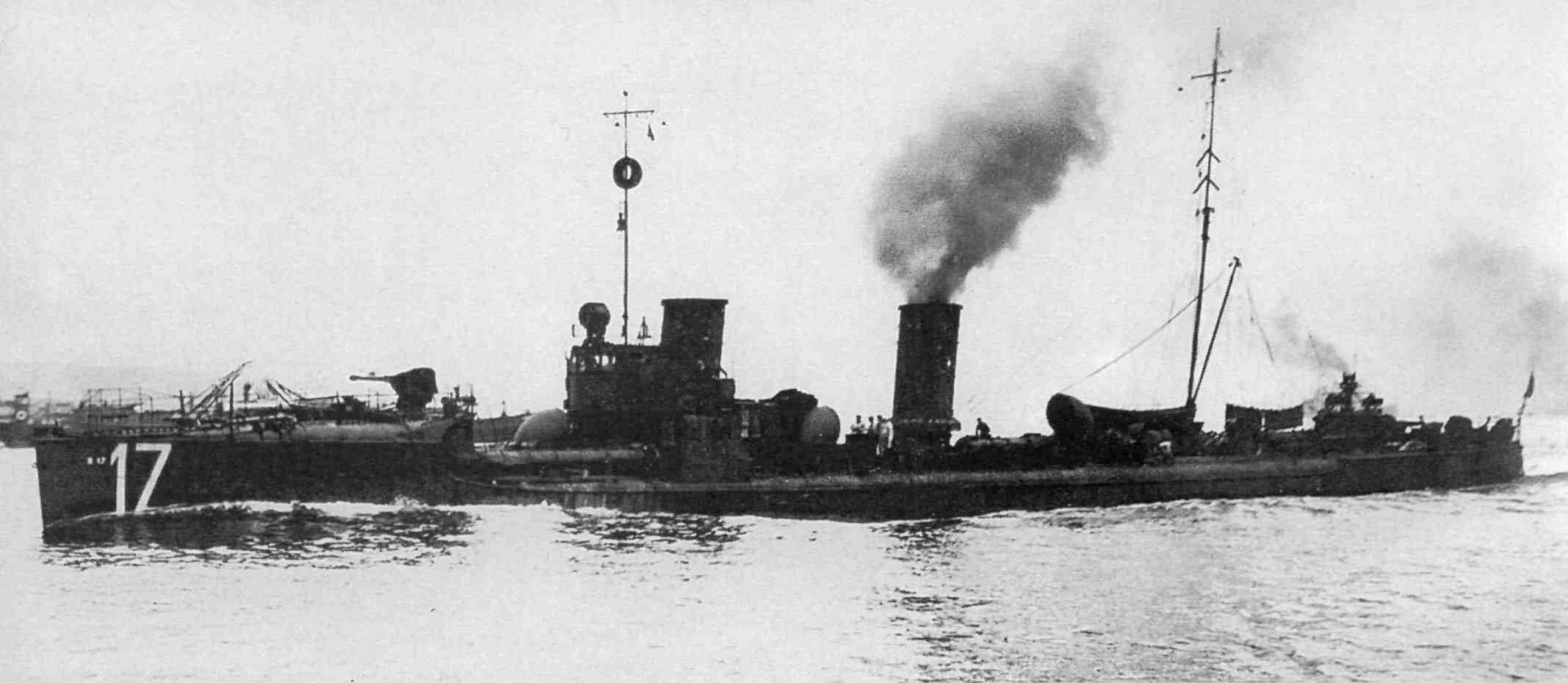
Sister-ship S17

The Schichau boats were 71.5 m (234 ft 7 in) long overall and 71.0 m (232 ft 11 in) at the waterline, with a beam of 7.43 m (24 ft 5 in) and a draught of 2.77 m (9 ft 1 in). Displacement was 568 tonnes (559 long tons) normal and 695 tonnes (684 long tons) deep load. Three coal-fired and one oil-fired water-tube boilers fed steam to two direct-drive steam turbines rated at 15,700 metric horsepower (15,500 shp; 11,500 kW), giving a design speed of 32.5 knots (60.2 km/h; 37.4 mph). 108 tonnes (106 long tons) of coal and 72 tonnes (71 long tons) of oil were carried, giving a range of 1,050 nautical miles (1,940 km; 1,210 mi) at 17 knots (31 km/h; 20 mph) or 600 nautical miles (1,100 km; 690 mi) at 29 knots (54 km/h; 33 mph).

S16's armament consisted of two 8.8 cm (3.5 in) SK L/30 naval guns (Note: In Imperial German Navy gun nomenclature, the L/30 denotes the length of the gun. In this case, the L/30 gun is 30 caliber, meaning that the gun is 30 times as long as it is in diameter.) in single mounts fore and aft, together with four 50 cm (19.7 in) torpedo tubes with one reload torpedo carried. Up to 18 mines could be carried. The ship had a crew of 74 officers and other ranks. In 1916, the guns were replaced by more powerful 8.8 cm SK L/45 naval guns.

S16, yard number 867, was launched at Schichau's shipyard in Elbing, East Prussia (now Elbląg in Poland) on 23 April 1912 and was commissioned on 1 October 1912.

== Service ==
S16 was a member of the 13th Half-flotilla of the 7th Torpedo boat flotilla of the German High Seas Fleet on the outbreak of war. The 7th Torpedo Boat Flotilla supported the Raid on Yarmouth on 3 November 1914 and the Raid on Scarborough, Hartlepool and Whitby on 16 December 1914. On 20 December, S16 reported being unsuccessfully attacked by a submarine off the mouth of the Jade river.

S16, as part of the 7th flotilla, was part of the High Seas Fleet when it sailed to cover the Lowestoft Raid on 24–25 April 1916. At the Battle of Jutland on 31 May–1 June 1916, S16 was still part of the 13th Half-flotilla of the 7th Torpedo boat flotilla, operating in support of the main German battle fleet. S16 picked up some of the survivors from the British destroyers Nomad and Nestor, which had previously been disabled and then sunk by fire from German battleships at about 18:30–18:35 CET (17:30–17:35 GMT) and two survivors from the British battlecruiser Indefatigable, which had blown up and sunk. During the night action, the 7th flotilla was ordered to search for and attack the British fleet. At about 23:00 hr CET (i.e. 22:00 hr GMT) on the night of 31 May/1 June, there was a brief confrontation between the 7th Torpedo Boat flotilla and the British 4th Destroyer Flotilla. Four German torpedo boats, including S16, each fired one torpedo at the British destroyers, although S16's torpedo misfired and did not correctly launch, while the British ships replied with gunfire, but no ships were damaged and contact was soon lost, although the two formations met again at about 23:42 CET (22:42 GMT) when S24 fired another torpedo, which also missed.

By late April 1917, the torpedo boats of the 7th Torpedo Boat Flotilla had been fitted for minesweeping and their crews trained in that task, and became increasingly dedicated to minesweeping. On 20 January 1918, S16 was sunk by a mine in the North Sea (54°41′N 6°32′E). 80 men, the whole of her crew, were killed. (Note: Fock and Kemp state that S16 was escorting the submarine UB-22, with UB-22 also being sunk, while Gröner et al. says that UB-22 was sunk the previous day.) The small A-class torpedo boats A73 and A77 were also sunk by mines in the vicinity on 20 January. These losses, together with the auxiliary minesweeper Doggerbank a few hours earlier, in what was a supposedly a mine-free channel resulted in the route being abandoned and a fresh route swept further to the south.

== Bibliography ==
- Campbell, John (1998). Jutland: An Analysis of the Fighting. London: Conway Maritime Press. ISBN 0-85177-750-3.
- Fock, Harald (1989). Z-Vor! Internationale Entwicklung und Kriegseinsätze von Zerstörern und Torpedobooten 1914 bis 1939 (in German). Herford, Germany: Koehlers Verlagsgesellschaft mBH. ISBN 3-7822-0207-4.
- Gardiner, Robert; Gray, Randal, eds. (1985). Conway's All The World's Fighting Ships 1906–1921. London: Conway Maritime Press. ISBN 0-85177-245-5.
- Grant, Robert M. (1964). U-Boats Destroyed: The Effect of Anti-Submarine Warfare 1914–1918. London: Putnam.
- Gröner, Erich; Jung, Dieter; Maass, Martin (1983). Die deutschen Kriegsschiffe 1815–1945: Band 2: Torpedoboote, Zerstörer, Schnellboote, Minensuchboote, Minenräumboote (in German). Koblenz: Bernard & Graef Verlag. ISBN 3-7637-4801-6.
- Gröner, Erich; Jung, Dieter; Maass, Martin (1985). Die deutschen Kriegsschiffe 1815–1945: Band 3: U-boote, Hilfskreuzer, Minenschiffe, Netzleger, Sperrbrecher (in German). Koblenz: Bernard & Graef Verlag. ISBN 3-7637-4802-4.
- Groos, O. (1923). Der Krieg in der Nordsee: Dritter Band: Von Ende November 1914 bis Unfang Februar 1915. Der Krieg zur See: 1914–1918 (in German). Berlin: Verlag von E. S. Mittler und Sohn – via National Library of Estonia.
- Kemp, Paul (1997). U-Boats Destroyed: German Submarine Losses in the World Wars. London: Arms & Armour Press. ISBN 1-85409-321-5.
- Monograph No. 32: Lowestoft Raid: 24th–25th April 1916 (PDF). Naval Staff Monographs (Historical). Vol. XVI. Naval Staff, Training and Staff Duties Division. 1927.
