= SMS S24 =

SMS S24 refers to two torpedo boats built by the German Kaiserliche Marine (Imperial Navy):

- SMS S24 (1886), a S7-class torpedo boat launched on 30 July 1889, renamed T24 in 1910.
- SMS S24 (1913), a V1-class torpedo boat launched in 1913 and sold for scrap in 1920.
