= SMS S22 =

SMS S22 refers to two torpedo boats built by the German Kaiserliche Marine (Imperial Navy):

- SMS S22 (1885), a S7-class torpedo boat launched on 1 October 1885, renamed T22 on 11 November 1910 and sold on 21 May 1921.
- SMS S22 (1913), a V1-class torpedo boat launched in 1913 and sunk by a mine on 26 March 1916.
