= SMS S17 =

List of ships with the same or similar names

Two ships of the German Imperial Navy were named SMS S17. They were both torpedo boats built by Schichau-Werke.

- SMS S17 (1885) - torpedo boat launched by Schichau on 15 August 1885. Stricken 1906 and used as a target boat. Sold 1910 and scrapped.
- SMS S17 (1912) - "large"- or "high-seas"-torpedo boat, launched by Schichau on 22 June 1912. Sunk by mine in North Sea 16 May 1917.
