= SMS S22 (1913) =

V1-class torpedo boat of the Imperial German Navy

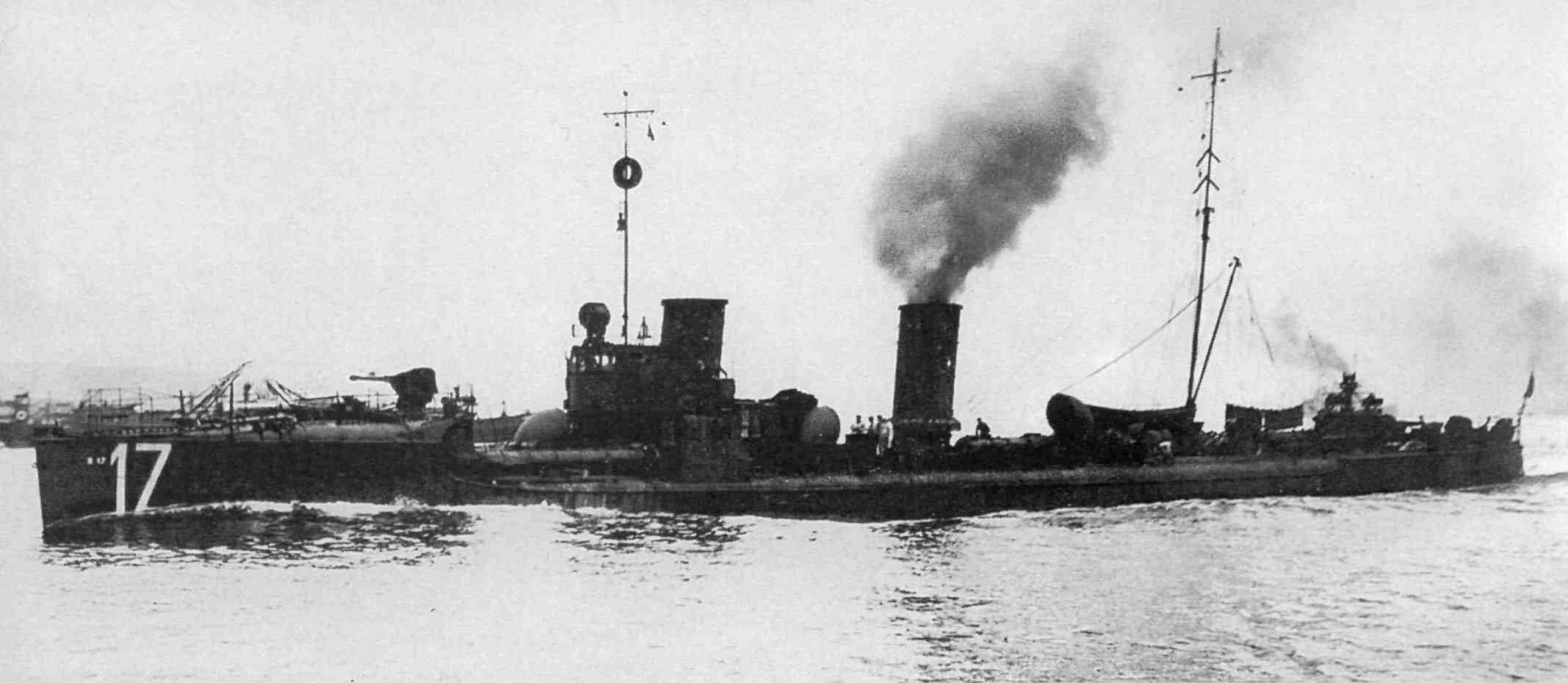
- Sister ship S17

History

Germany
- Name: S22
- Builder: Schichau-Werke, Elbing
- Launched: 15 February 1913
- Commissioned: 23 July 1913
- Fate: Mined and sunk 26 March 1916

General characteristics
- Displacement: 697 t (686 long tons)
- Length: 71.1 m (233 ft 3 in) oa
- Beam: 7.6 m (24 ft 11 in)
- Draft: 3.11 m (10 ft 2 in)
- Propulsion: 4× water-tube boilers; 2× steam turbines; 17,000 metric horsepower (17,000 shp; 13,000 kW)
- Speed: 32 knots (59.3 km/h; 36.8 mph)
- Range: 1,190 nmi (2,200 km; 1,370 mi) at 17 knots (31 km/h; 20 mph)
- Complement: 74 officers and sailors
- Armament: 2 x 8.8 cm (3.5 in)/30 guns; 4 x 50 cm (20 in) torpedo tubes

SMS S22 (Note: "SMS" stands for "Seiner Majestät Schiff" (German: His Majesty's Ship)) (Note: The "S" in S22 denotes the shipyard at which she was built, in this case Schichau-Werke.) was a V1-class torpedo boat of the Imperial German Navy. The ship was built by Schichau-Werke at their Elbing shipyard, completing in 1913. S22 served with the German High Seas Fleet during the First World War and was sunk by a mine on 26 March 1916.

== Construction and design ==
The V1-class was a new class of torpedo boat intended to be smaller and more manoeuvrable than the Imperial German Navy's latest torpedo boats, which would be more suitable for working with the fleet. Twelve ships were ordered from AG Vulcan and Germaniawerft (Note: The Imperial German Navy's practice was to split a year's orders into half-flotillas of six torpedo boats from different builders, to differing detailed design.) under the 1911 construction programme, while in 1912, twelve ships of similar design (S13–S24) were ordered from Schichau-Werke. The reduction in size resulted in the ships' seaworthiness being adversely affected, however, and range being reduced, with the 1911 and 1912 torpedo boats acquiring the disparaging nickname "Admiral Lans' cripples".

The Schichau boats were 71.5 m (234 ft 7 in) long overall and 71.0 m (232 ft 11 in) at the waterline, with a beam of 7.43 m (24 ft 5 in) and a draught of 2.77 m (9 ft 1 in). Displacement was 568 tonnes (559 long tons) normal and 695 tonnes (684 long tons) deep load. Three coal-fired and one oil-fired water-tube boilers fed steam to two direct-drive steam turbines rated at 15,700 metric horsepower (15,500 shp; 11,500 kW), giving a design speed of 32.5 knots (60.2 km/h; 37.4 mph). 108 tonnes (106 long tons) of coal and 72 tonnes (71 long tons) of oil were carried, giving a range of 1,050 nautical miles (1,940 km; 1,210 mi) at 17 knots (31 km/h; 20 mph) or 600 nautical miles (1,100 km; 690 mi) at 29 knots (54 km/h; 33 mph).

S22's armament consisted of two 8.8 cm (3.5 in) SK L/30 naval guns (Note: In Imperial German Navy gun nomenclature, the L/30 denotes the length of the gun. In this case, the L/30 gun is 30 caliber, meaning that the gun is 30 times as long as it is in diameter.) in single mounts fore and aft, together with four 50 cm (19.7 in) torpedo tubes with one reload torpedo carried. Up to 18 mines could be carried. The ship had a crew of 3 officers and 71 other ranks.

S22, yard number 873, was launched at Schichau's shipyard in Elbing, East Prussia (now Elbląg in Poland) on 15 February 1913 and was commissioned on 23 July 1913.

== Service ==
In May 1914, S22 was a member of the 14th half-flotilla of the 7th Torpedo boat Flotilla. She remained part of the 14th half-flotilla at the outbreak of the First World War in August 1914. The 7th Torpedo Boat Flotilla supported the Raid on Yarmouth on 3 November 1914 and the Raid on Scarborough, Hartlepool and Whitby on 16 December 1914.

In May 1915, in support of the Gorlice–Tarnów offensive on the Eastern Front, Germany launched an attack against Libau (now Liepāja) in Latvia, with naval support from the German navy. The 14th half-flotilla, (Note: S22, S19, S20 and S23) including S22, formed part of a force of four light cruisers and 21 torpedo boats detached from the High Seas Fleet in support of the Baltic operations. They were used to prevent interference by the Russian navy with the operations, patrolling between Ösel and Gotska Sandön and between Gotska Sandön and the Swedish coast, with S22 forming part of a patrol line between Öland and Stora Karlsö on 10–11 May 1915. The force detached from the High Seas Fleet was recalled to the North Sea soon after Libau was captured.

On the night of 19/20 December 1915, the two torpedo boats S22 and S23 of the 7th Flotilla stopped the Swedish steamer Argo, suspected of carrying contraband to Russia near Simrishamn on the East coast of Sweden. Argo rammed S22 and made off, ignoring a warning shot over her bows, with the two torpedo boats not opening fire as their commanding officer was unsure whether they were in Swedish territorial waters. The Flotilla commander ordered the torpedo boats S15 and S17 to intercept Argo and to use "all means" to capture the ship. Argo was seized at Utlängan in Swedish waters and taken to the German port of Swinemünde (now Świnoujście in Poland) but was released after a few hours.

On 25 March 1916, the British seaplane carrier Vindex, escorted by the cruisers and destroyers of the Harwich Force, launched an air attack against a Zeppelin base believed to be at Hoyer on the coast of Schleswig. The raid was a failure, with the airship base actually at Tondern. The British destroyer Medusa being badly damaged by a collision with the destroyer Laverock and later being abandoned. German cruisers and torpedo boats were ordered to search for the withdrawing British force, with S22 one of five torpedo boats (Note: S22, S18, V29, G42 and G85) that accompanied the light cruiser Rostock. At 21:35 hr on 26 March, S22 struck a mine about 35 nmi (40 mi; 65 km) west of the Borkum Riff Lightship, with the explosion blowing off the bow of the torpedo boat, which sank quickly, killing 76 of S22's crew of 93.

The searching force soon turned back to port, as the weather was too poor for the torpedo boats to use their armament or keep an effective lookout. Another German force of torpedo boats encountered British cruisers the same night, with the torpedo boat G194 rammed and sunk by the light cruiser Cleopatra, with Cleopatra herself rammed and by the cruiser Undaunted, which sustained serious damage.

The Nazi German destroyer Karl Galster, which was commissioned on 21 March 1939, was named after S22's commanding officer killed during S22's sinking.

== Bibliography ==
- Fock, Harald (1981). Schwarze Gesellen: Band 2: Zerstörer bis 1914 (in German). Herford, Germany: Koelers Verlagsgesellschaft mBH. ISBN 3-7822-0206-6.
- Fock, Harald (1989). Z-Vor! Internationale Entwicklung und Kriegseinsätze von Zerstörern und Torpedobooten 1914 bis 1939 (in German). Herford, Germany: Koehlers Verlagsgesellschaft mBH. ISBN 3-7822-0207-4.
- Gardiner, Robert; Gray, Randal, eds. (1985). Conway's All The World's Fighting Ships 1906–1921. London: Conway Maritime Press. ISBN 0-85177-245-5.
- Gröner, Erich; Jung, Dieter; Maass, Martin (1983). Die deutschen Kriegsschiffe 1815–1945: Band 2: Torpedoboote, Zerstörer, Schnellboote, Minensuchboote, Minenräumboote (in German). Koblenz: Bernard & Graef Verlag. ISBN 3-7637-4801-6.
- Halpern, Paul G. (1994). A Naval History of World War I. London: UCL Press. ISBN 1-85728-498-4.
- Koop, Gerhard; Schmolke, Klaus-Peter (2014). German Destroyers of World War II. Barnsley, UK: Seaforth Publishing. ISBN 978-1-84832-193-9.
- Monograph No. 31: Home Waters—Part VI.: From October 1915 to May 1916 (PDF). Naval Staff Monographs (Historical). Vol. XV. Naval Staff, Training and Staff Duties Division. 1926.
- Rangelist der Kaiserlich Deutschen Marine für Das Jahr 1914 (in German). Berlin: Ernst Siegfried Mittler und Sohn. 1914 – via Heinrich Hein Universität Düsseldorf.
- Rollmann, Heinrich (1929). Der Krieg in der Ostsee: Zweiter Band: Das Kreigjahr 1915. Der Krieg zur See: 1914–1918 (in German). Berlin: Verlag von E. S. Mittler und Sohn.
