= SMS S18 =

List of ships with the same or similar names

Two ships of the German Imperial Navy were named SMS S18. They were both torpedo boats built by Schichau-Werke.

- SMS S18 (1885) - torpedo boat launched by Schichau on 24 August 1885. Stricken 1905 and used as a guard boat and target boat. Sold 1918 and scrapped.
- SMS S18 (1912) - "large"- or "high-seas"-torpedo boat, launched by Schichau on 22 June 1912. Scrapped 1935.
