= SMS S18 (1912) =

V1-class torpedo boat of the Imperial German Navy

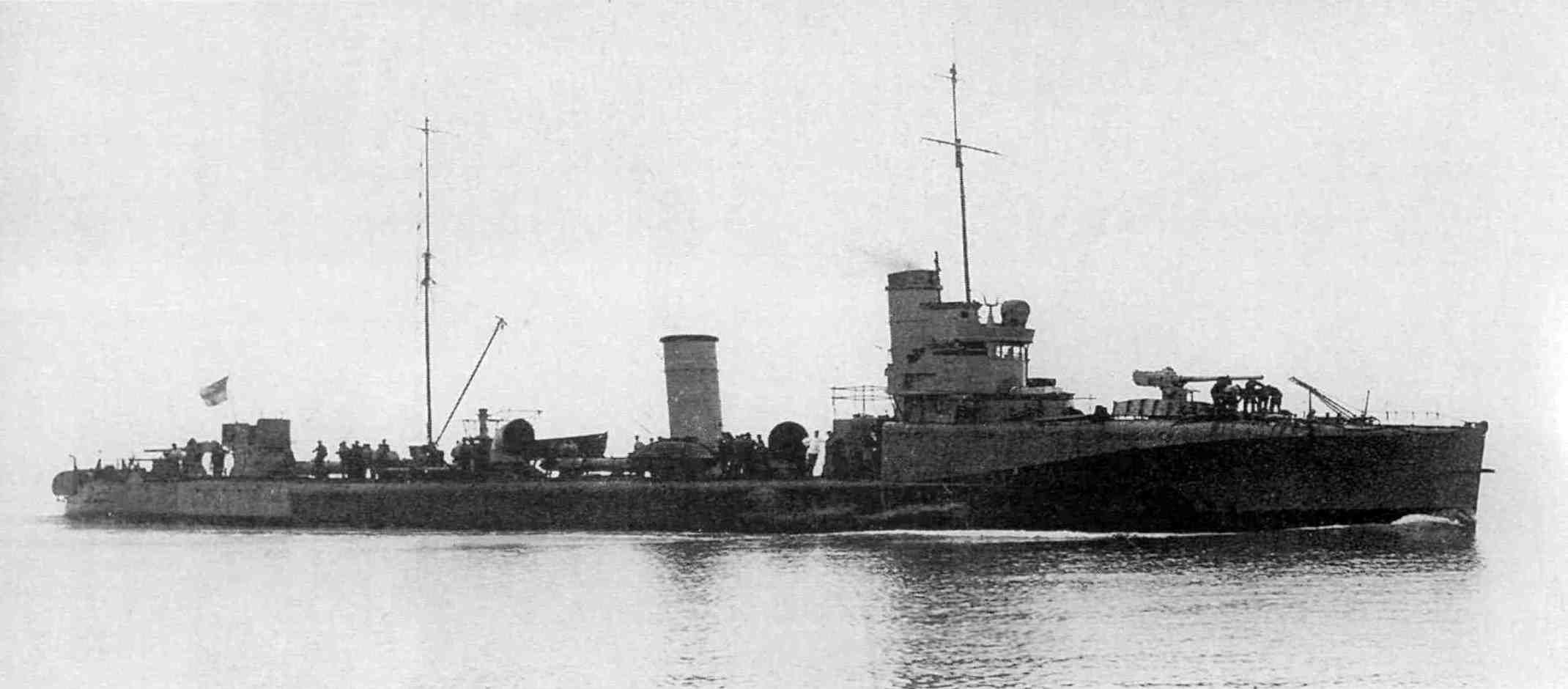
- S18, after having her forecastle lengthened in 1917

History

Germany
- Name: S18
- Builder: Schichau-Werke, Elbing
- Launched: 10 August 1912
- Commissioned: 12 January 1913
- Fate: Scrapped 1935

General characteristics
- Displacement: 697 t (686 long tons)
- Length: 71.1 m (233 ft 3 in) oa
- Beam: 7.6 m (24 ft 11 in)
- Draft: 3.11 m (10 ft 2 in)
- Propulsion: 4× water-tube boilers; 2× steam turbines; 17,000 metric horsepower (17,000 shp; 13,000 kW)
- Speed: 32 knots (59.3 km/h; 36.8 mph)
- Range: 1,190 nmi (2,200 km; 1,370 mi) at 17 knots (31 km/h; 20 mph)
- Complement: 74 officers and sailors
- Armament: 2 x 8.8 cm (3.5 in)/30 guns; 4 x 50 cm (20 in) torpedo tubes

SMS S18 (Note: "SMS" stands for "Seiner Majestät Schiff" (German: His Majesty's Ship)) (Note: The "S" in S18 denotes the shipyard at which she was built, in this case Schichau-Werke.) was a V1-class torpedo boat of the Imperial German Navy. The ship was built by Schichau-Werke, at their Elbing shipyard, completing in 1912. S18 served with the German High Seas Fleet during the First World War, taking part in the Battle of Jutland in 1916. S18 survived the war, serving in the Weimar Republic's Reichsmarine. She was scrapped in 1935.

== Construction and design ==
In 1911, the Imperial German Navy decided to break the pattern of each year's orders of torpedo boats being a development of the previous year's designs, as it felt that they were getting too big to work for the fleet, and instead the 12 torpedo boats (six each ordered from AG Vulcan and Germaniawerft (Note: The Imperial German Navy's practice was to split a year's orders into half-flotillas of six torpedo boats from different builders, to differing detailed design.)) (the V1-class) were smaller than those ordered in recent years in order to be more manoeuvrable and so work better with the fleet. This change resulted in the numbering series for torpedo boats being restarted. The 1912 programme placed orders for a flotilla of 12 torpedo boats of similar design (S13 to S24) with Schichau-Werke. The reduction in size resulted in the ships' seaworthiness being adversely affected, however, with the 1911 and 1912 torpedo boats acquiring the disparaging nickname "Admiral Lans' cripples".

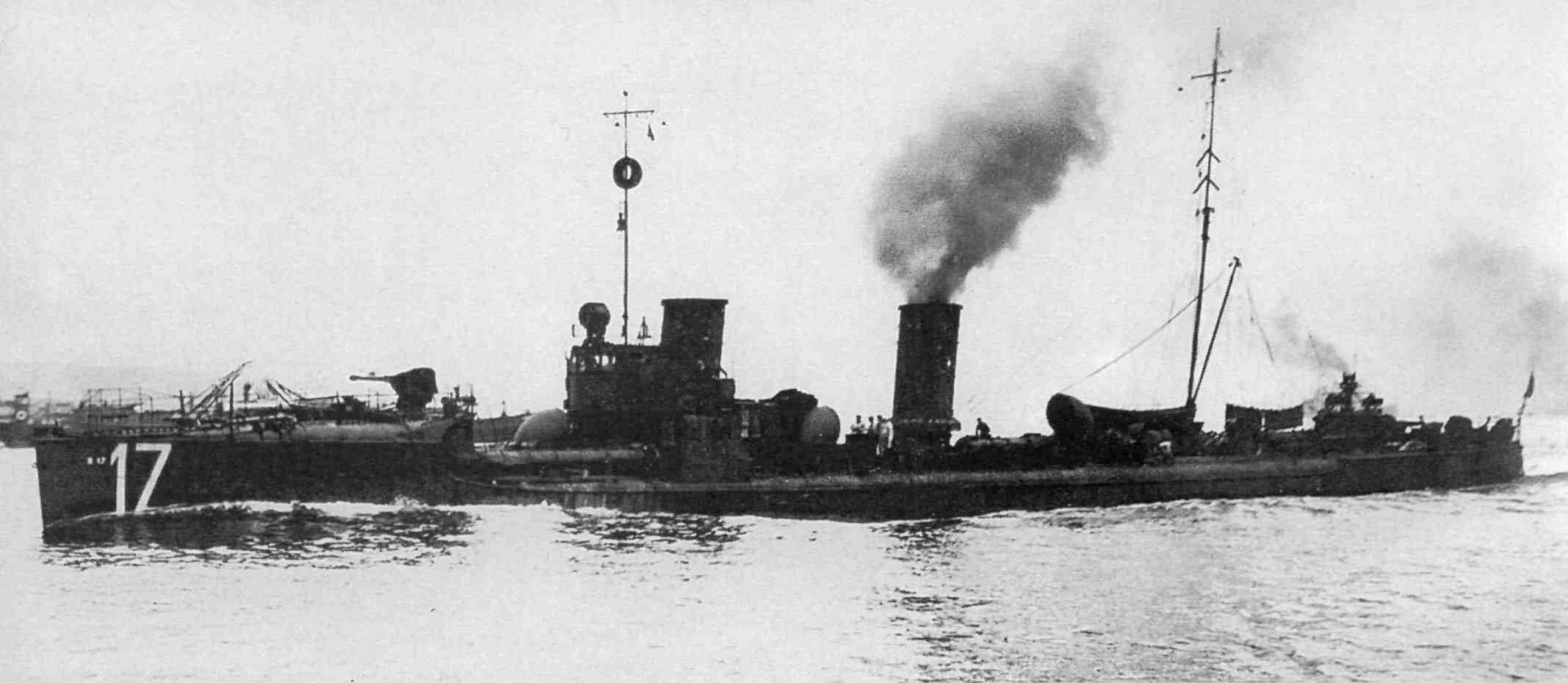
Sister ship S17

The Schichau boats were 71.5 m (234 ft 7 in) long overall and 71.0 m (232 ft 11 in) at the waterline, with a beam of 7.43 m (24 ft 5 in) and a draught of 2.77 m (9 ft 1 in). Displacement was 568 tonnes (559 long tons) normal and 695 tonnes (684 long tons) deep load. Three coal-fired and one oil-fired water-tube boilers fed steam to two direct-drive steam turbines rated at 15,700 metric horsepower (15,500 shp; 11,500 kW), giving a design speed of 32.5 knots (60.2 km/h; 37.4 mph). 108 tonnes (106 long tons) of coal and 72 tonnes (71 long tons) of oil were carried, giving a range of 1,050 nautical miles (1,940 km; 1,210 mi) at 17 knots (31 km/h; 20 mph) or 600 nautical miles (1,100 km; 690 mi) at 29 knots (54 km/h; 33 mph).

S18's armament consisted of two 8.8 cm (3.5 in) SK L/30 naval guns (Note: In Imperial German Navy gun nomenclature, the L/30 denotes the length of the gun. In this case, the L/30 gun is 30 caliber, meaning that the gun is 30 times as long as it is in diameter.) in single mounts fore and aft, together with four 50 cm (19.7 in) torpedo tubes with one reload torpedo carried. Up to 18 mines could be carried. The ship had a crew of 74 officers and other ranks. In 1916, the guns were replaced by more powerful 8.8 cm SK L/45 naval guns, and in 1917, these guns were again replaced, this time with 10.5 cm SK L/45 naval guns, while the ship's forecastle was lengthened.

S18, yard number 869, was launched at Schichau's shipyard in Elbing, East Prussia (now Elbląg in Poland) on 10 August 1912 and was commissioned on 12 January 1913.

== Service ==
In May 1914, S18 was part of the 13th half-flotilla of the 7th Torpedo boat Flotilla.

=== First World War ===
S18 remained a member of the 13th half-flotilla of the 7th Flotilla, part of the German High Seas Fleet, at the outbreak of the First World War in August 1914. The 7th Torpedo Boat Flotilla supported the Raid on Yarmouth on 3 November 1914 and the Raid on Scarborough, Hartlepool and Whitby on 16 December 1914. The flotilla continued to support the High Seas Fleet in 1915, sortieing into the German Bight with the 5th and 9th Flotilla on 19/20 January and escorting a sortie of the fleet's battleships to off Terschelling on 29/30 March. S18, as part of the 7th flotilla, was part of the High Seas Fleet when it sailed to cover the Lowestoft Raid on 24–25 April 1916.

At the Battle of Jutland on 31 May–1 June 1916, S18 was still part of the 13th Half-flotilla of the 7th Torpedo boat flotilla, operating in support of the main German battle fleet. During the night action, the 7th flotilla was ordered to search for and attack the British fleet, being allocated the sector to the south-east of the German fleet. The speed of the ships of the 7th flotilla, (and those of the 5th Flotilla, patrolling the adjacent sector) was limited to less than 17 kn (20 mph; 31 km/h) by the need to minimise the production of smoke and sparks which would give their location away in any confrontation at night, and by the tiredness of their stokers, as the ships had been operating at high speeds for most of the preceding day. As the British fleet had a night cruising speed of 17 knots, this would limit the 7th Flotilla's effectiveness. At about 23:00 hr CET (i.e. 22:00 hr GMT) on the night of 31 May/1 June, there was a brief confrontation between the 7th Torpedo Boat flotilla and the British 4th Destroyer Flotilla. Four German torpedo boats, including S16, each fired one torpedo at the British destroyers, while the British ships replied with gunfire, but no ships were damaged and contact was soon lost, although the two formations met again at about 23:42 CET (22:42 GMT) when S24 fired another torpedo, which also missed. S18 then helped to escort the battlecruiser Seydlitz back to port.

In February 1917, S18 was one of ten torpedo boats transferred to the German naval forces based in Flanders, arriving in Belgium on the 18th of that month, joining the 2nd Zeebrugge half-flotilla. On 25 February 1917, S18 carried out her first operation with the Flanders flotillas, being ordered, together with S20 and S24, to attack shipping between Britain and the Netherlands while six other torpedo boats attacked the patrols of the Dover Patrol and shelled Dover, while a third group of five torpedo boats attacked shipping near the North Foreland lightship. The attack was ineffective, with no shipping encountered. A second attack on the Channel was launched on the night of 17/18 March 1917, with the 2nd Zeebrugge half-flotilla (Note: S15, S18, S20 and S24.) being assigned to attack shipping in the Downs. S18's group swept past the drifters guarding the entrance to the Downs, firing at one of the drifters, the Paramount as they passed. Only a single merchant ship, the steamer SS Greypoint, which was suffering from engine problems was anchored in the Downs. S20 sank Greypoint with a torpedo while S18 shelled Margate.

On the night of 3/4 September 1917, S18 was damaged in a British air raid on Zeebrugge. On 11 September 1917, S17, S24, V47, V68 and V69 left Flanders for Germany. S17 and S24 were to rejoin the High Seas Fleet, while the other three torpedo boats were being sent for repair before returning to Flanders. Later that year, S18 was transferred to an escort flotilla, and on 17 November 1917, she was part of the escort for German battleships during the Second Battle of Heligoland Bight. and at the end of the war was still a member of the 1st half-flotilla of the 1st Escort Flotilla.

=== Postwar operations ===
S18 was one of the 12 destroyers and 12 torpedo boats that the Weimar Republic's Reichsmarine was allowed to retain under the Treaty of Versailles. (Note: Although treated as destroyers under the treaty, S18 and other ships of her type were always referred to as torpedo boats by the Germans.) She was recommissioned on 25 May 1921, serving in the Baltic Sea. On 23 May 1922 she collided with the battleship Hannover off Rügen during night manoeuvres, killing 10 of S18's crew. S18 was stricken on 31 May 1931, and scrapped at Wilhelmshaven in 1935.

== Bibliography ==
- Campbell, John (1998). Jutland: An Analysis of the Fighting. London: Conway Maritime Press. ISBN 0-85177-750-3.
- Dodson, Aidan (2019). "Beyond the Kaiser: The IGN's Destroyers and Torpedo Boats After 1918". In Jordan, John (ed.). Warship 2019. Oxford, UK: Osprey Publishing. pp. 129–144. ISBN 978-1-4728-3595-6.
- Fock, Harald (1989). Z-Vor! Internationale Entwicklung und Kriegseinsätze von Zerstörern und Torpedobooten 1914 bis 1939 (in German). Herford, Germany: Koehlers Verlagsgesellschaft mBH. ISBN 3-7822-0207-4.
- Gardiner, Robert; Chesneau, Robert, eds. (1980). Conway's All The World's Fighting Ships 1922–1946. London: Conway Maritime Press. ISBN 0-85177-146-7.
- Gardiner, Robert; Gray, Randal, eds. (1985). Conway's All The World's Fighting Ships 1906–1921. London: Conway Maritime Press. ISBN 0-85177-245-5.
- Gladisch, Walter, ed. (1965). Der Krieg in der Nordsee: Band 7: Vom Sommer 1917 bis zum Kriegsende 1918 (in German). Frankfurt: Verlag E.S. Mittler & Sohn.
- Gröner, Erich; Jung, Dieter; Maass, Martin (1983). Die deutschen Kriegsschiffe 1815–1945: Band 2: Torpedoboote, Zerstörer, Schnellboote, Minensuchboote, Minenräumboote (in German). Koblenz: Bernard & Graef Verlag. ISBN 3-7637-4801-6.
- Hildebrand, Hans H.; Röhr, Albert; Steinmetz, Hans-Otto (1985). Die Deutschen Kriegsschiffe: Biographien: ein Spiegel der Marinegeschichte von 1815 bis zur Gegenwart (Band 3) [The German Warships: Biographies: A Reflection of Naval History from 1815 to the Present] (in German). Vol. 3. Herford, Germany: Koehlers Verlagsgesellschaft. ISBN 3-7822-0371-2.
- Karau, Mark K. (2014). The Naval Flank of the Western Front: The German MarineKorps Flandern 1914–1918. Barnsley: Seaforth Publishing. ISBN 978-1-84832-231-8.
- Monograph No. 32: Lowestoft Raid: 24th–25th April 1916 (PDF). Naval Staff Monographs (Historical). Vol. XVI. Naval Staff, Training and Staff Duties Division. 1927.
- Monograph No. 34: Home Waters—Part VIII.: December 1916 to April 1917 (PDF). Naval Staff Monographs (Historical). Vol. XVIII. Naval Staff, Training and Staff Duties Division. 1933.
- Newbolt, Henry (1928). Naval Operations. History of the Great War Based on Official Documents by Direction of the Historical Section of the Committee of Imperial Defence. Vol. IV. London: Longmans Green & Co.
- Tarrant, V. E. (1997). Jutland: The German Perspective. London: Arms & Armour Press. ISBN 1-85409-442-4.
