= SMS S17 (1912) =

Imperial German torpedo boat

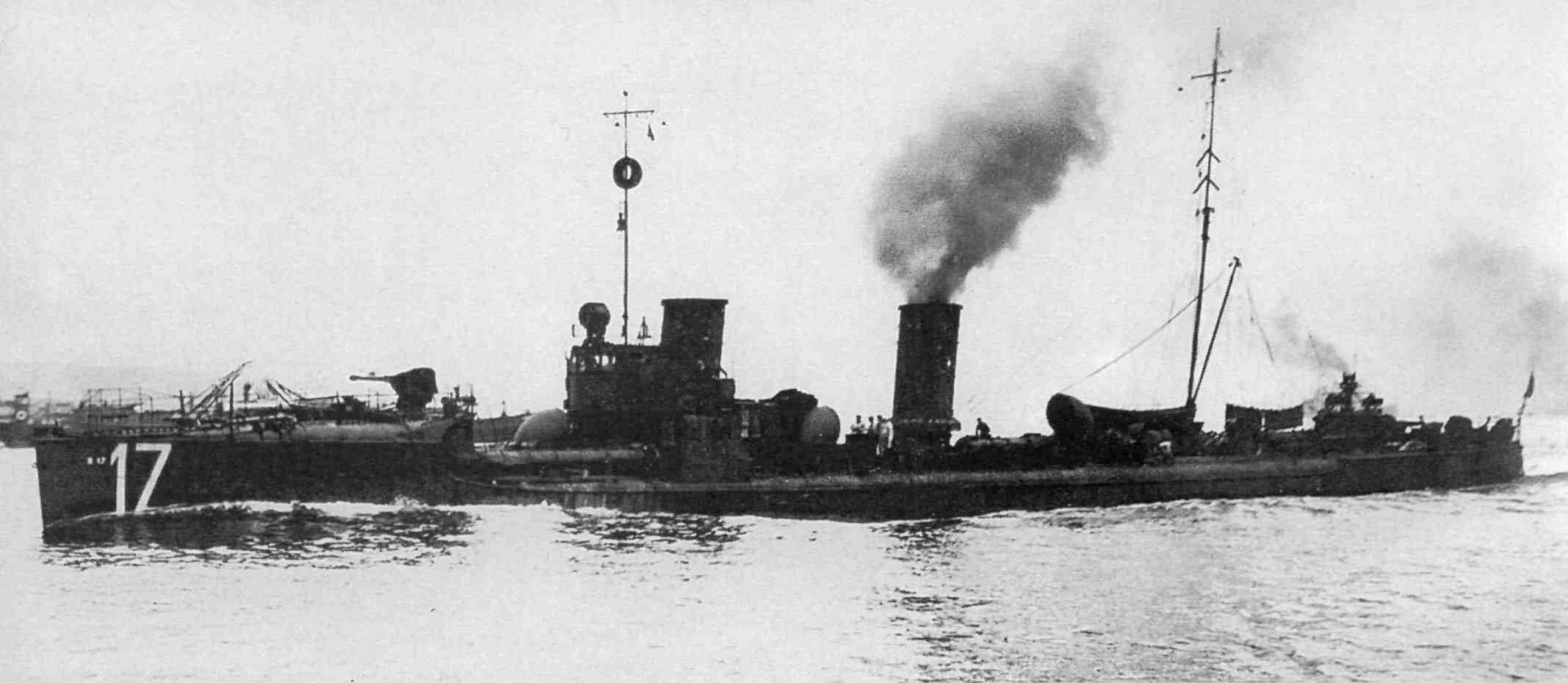

History

German Empire
- Name: S17
- Builder: Schichau-Werke, Elbing
- Launched: 22 June 1912
- Commissioned: 7 December 1912
- Fate: Mined 16 May 1917

General characteristics
- Displacement: 697 t (686 long tons)
- Length: 71.1 m (233 ft 3 in) oa
- Beam: 7.6 m (24 ft 11 in)
- Draft: 3.11 m (10 ft 2 in)
- Propulsion: 4× water-tube boilers; 2× steam turbines; 17,000 metric horsepower (17,000 shp; 13,000 kW)
- Speed: 32 knots (59.3 km/h; 36.8 mph)
- Range: 1,190 nmi (2,200 km; 1,370 mi) at 17 knots (31 km/h; 20 mph)
- Complement: 74 officers and sailors
- Armament: 2 x 8.8 cm (3.5 in)/30 guns; 4 x 50 cm (20 in) torpedo tubes

SMS S17 (Note: "SMS" stands for "Seiner Majestät Schiff" (German: His Majesty's Ship)) (Note: The "S" in S17 denotes the shipyard at which she was built, in this case Schichau-Werke.) was a V1-class torpedo boat of the Imperial German Navy. The ship was built by Schichau-Werke, at their Elbing shipyard, completing in 1912. S17 served with the German High Seas Fleet during the First World War, taking part in the Battle of Jutland in 1916. She was sunk by a mine on 16 May 1917.

== Construction and design ==
In 1911, the Imperial German Navy decided to break the pattern of each year's orders of torpedo boats being a development of the previous year's designs, as it felt that they were getting too big to work for the fleet, and instead the 12 torpedo boats (six each ordered from AG Vulcan and Germaniawerft (Note: The Imperial German Navy's practice was to split a year's orders into half-flotillas of six torpedo boats from different builders, to differing detailed design.)) (the V1-class) were smaller than those ordered in recent years in order to be more manoeuvrable and so work better with the fleet. This change resulted in the numbering series for torpedo boats being restarted. The 1912 programme placed orders for a flotilla of 12 torpedo boats of similar design (S13 to S24) with Schichau-Werke. The reduction in size resulted in the ships' seaworthiness being adversely affected, however, with the 1911 and 1912 torpedo boats acquiring the disparaging nickname "Admiral Lans' cripples".

The Schichau boats were 71.5 m (234 ft 7 in) long overall and 71.0 m (232 ft 11 in) at the waterline, with a beam of 7.43 m (24 ft 5 in) and a draught of 2.77 m (9 ft 1 in). Displacement was 568 tonnes (559 long tons) normal and 695 tonnes (684 long tons) deep load. Three coal-fired and one oil-fired water-tube boilers fed steam to two direct-drive steam turbines rated at 15,700 metric horsepower (15,500 shp; 11,500 kW), giving a design speed of 32.5 knots (60.2 km/h; 37.4 mph). 108 tonnes (106 long tons) of coal and 72 tonnes (71 long tons) of oil were carried, giving a range of 1,050 nautical miles (1,940 km; 1,210 mi) at 17 knots (31 km/h; 20 mph) or 600 nautical miles (1,100 km; 690 mi) at 29 knots (54 km/h; 33 mph).

S17's armament consisted of two 8.8 cm (3.5 in) SK L/30 naval guns (Note: In Imperial German Navy gun nomenclature, the L/30 denotes the length of the gun. In this case, the L/30 gun is 30 caliber, meaning that the gun is 30 times as long as it is in diameter.) in single mounts fore and aft, together with four 50 cm (19.7 in) torpedo tubes with one reload torpedo carried. Up to 18 mines could be carried. The ship had a crew of 74 officers and other ranks. In 1916, the guns were replaced by more powerful 8.8 cm SK L/45 naval guns.

S17, yard number 868, was launched at Schichau's shipyard in Elbing, East Prussia (now Elbląg in Poland) on 22 June 1912 and was commissioned on 7 December that year.

== Service ==
In May 1914, S17 was part of the 13th half-flotilla of the 7th Torpedo boat Flotilla.

=== First World War ===
S17 remained a member of the 13th half-flotilla of the 7th Flotilla, part of the German High Seas Fleet, at the outbreak of the First World War in August 1914. The 7th Torpedo Boat Flotilla supported the Raid on Yarmouth on 3 November 1914 and the Raid on Scarborough, Hartlepool and Whitby on 16 December 1914. On the night of 19/20 December 1915, the two torpedo boats S22 and S23 of the 7th Flotilla stopped the Swedish steamer Argo, suspected of carrying contraband to Russia near Simrishamn on the East coast of Sweden. Argo rammed S22 and made off, with the two torpedo boats not opening fire as the commanding officer was unsure whether they were in Swedish territorial waters. The Flotilla commander disagreed, arguing that Argos's hostile actions authorised the use of force, and ordered S17 and S15 to intercept Argo and to use "all means" to capture the ship. Argo was seized at Utlängan in Swedish waters, and taken to the German port of Swinemünde (now Świnoujście in Poland) but was released after a few hours.

S17, as part of the 7th flotilla, was part of the High Seas Fleet when it sailed to cover the Lowestoft Raid on 24–25 April 1916. At the Battle of Jutland on 31 May–1 June 1916, S17 was still part of the 13th Half-flotilla of the 7th Torpedo boat flotilla, operating in support of the main German battle fleet. S17 picked up some of the survivors from the British destroyers Nomad and Nestor, which had previously been disabled and then sunk by fire from German battleships at about 18:30–18:35 CET (17:30–17:35 GMT). During the night action, the 7th flotilla was ordered to search for and attack the British fleet, being allocated the sector to the south-east of the German fleet. The speed of the ships of the 7th flotilla, (and those of the 5th Flotilla, patrolling the adjacent sector) was limited to less than 17 kn (20 mph; 31 km/h) by the need to minimise the production of smoke and sparks which would give their location away in any confrontation at night, and by the tiredness of their stokers, as the ships had been operating at high speeds for most of the preceding day. As the British fleet had a night cruising speed of 17 knots, this would limit the 7th Flotilla's effectiveness. The 7th Flotilla briefly clashed twice with British destroyers during the night, but no ships on either side were damaged in these clashes and S17 did not open fire.

S17 was transferred to coastal defence duties in 1917, and on 16 May 1917 was sunk by a mine in the North Sea (53°34′N 5°56′E), that had been laid by the British submarine E34 on 12 May. Twenty-six of S17's crew were killed, and the minesweepers T78 (an old torpedo boat) and M14 were mined and sunk that day in attempts to salvage S17. In total eight ships were claimed by this small minefield of 20 mines by the end of June.

== Bibliography ==
- Campbell, John (1998). Jutland: An Analysis of the Fighting. London: Conway Maritime Press. ISBN 0-85177-750-3.
- Fock, Harald (1989). Z-Vor! Internationale Entwicklung und Kriegseinsätze von Zerstörern und Torpedobooten 1914 bis 1939 (in German). Herford, Germany: Koehlers Verlagsgesellschaft mBH. ISBN 3-7822-0207-4.
- Gardiner, Robert; Gray, Randal, eds. (1985). Conway's All The World's Fighting Ships 1906–1921. London: Conway Maritime Press. ISBN 0-85177-245-5.
- Gröner, Erich; Jung, Dieter; Maass, Martin (1983). Die deutschen Kriegsschiffe 1815–1945: Band 2: Torpedoboote, Zerstörer, Schnellboote, Minensuchboote, Minenräumboote (in German). Koblenz: Bernard & Graef Verlag. ISBN 3-7637-4801-6.
- Monograph No. 32: Lowestoft Raid: 24th–25th April 1916 (PDF). Naval Staff Monographs (Historical). Vol. XVI. Naval Staff, Training and Staff Duties Division. 1927.
- Monograph No. 35: Home Waters—Part IX: 1st May, 1917, to 31st July, 1917 (PDF). Naval Staff Monographs (Historical). Vol. XIX. The Naval Staff, Training and Staff Duties Division. 1939.
- Rollmann, Heinrich (1929). Der Krieg in der Ostsee: Zweiter Band: Das Kreigjahr 1915. Der Krieg zur See: 1914–1918 (in German). Berlin: Verlag von E. S. Mittler und Sohn.
- Tarrant, V. E. (1997). Jutland: The German Perspective. London: Arms & Armour Press. ISBN 1-85409-442-4.
