= SMS S24 (1913) =

Torpedo boat of the Imperial German Navy

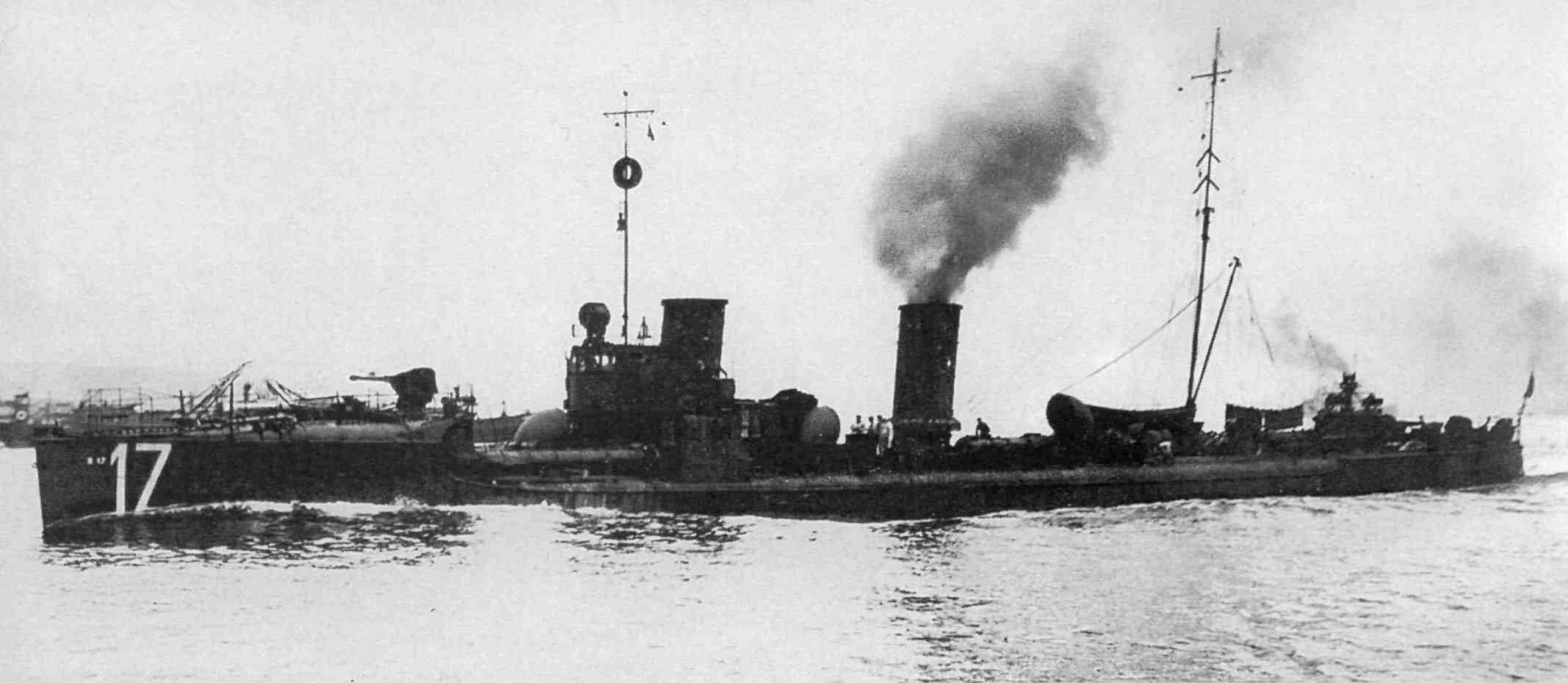
- Sister ship S17

History

Germany
- Name: S24
- Builder: Schichau-Werke, Elbing
- Launched: 28 June 1913
- Commissioned: 27 August 1913
- Fate: Sold for scrap 1920

General characteristics
- Displacement: 568 t (559 long tons) normal
- Length: 71.5 m (234 ft 7 in) oa
- Beam: 7.43 m (24 ft 5 in)
- Draft: 2.77 m (9 ft 1 in)
- Propulsion: 4× water-tube boilers; 2× steam turbines; 15,700 metric horsepower (15,500 shp; 11,500 kW)
- Speed: 32.5 knots (60.2 km/h; 37.4 mph)
- Range: 1,050 nmi (1,940 km; 1,210 mi) at 17 knots (31 km/h; 20 mph)
- Complement: 74 officers and sailors
- Armament: 2 x 8.8 cm (3.5 in) guns; 4 x 50 cm (20 in) torpedo tubes

SMS S24 (Note: "SMS" stands for "Seiner Majestät Schiff" (German: His Majesty's Ship)) (Note: The "S" in S24 denotes the shipyard at which she was built, in this case Schichau-Werke.) was a V1-class torpedo boat of the Imperial German Navy. The ship was built by Schichau-Werke, at their Elbing shipyard, completing in 1913.

S24 served as part of the German High Seas Fleet through the First World War, taking part in the Battle of Jutland in 1916. The ship was allocated to Britain for disposal as a result of the Treaty of Versailles and was sold for scrap in 1920.

== Construction and design ==
The V1-class was a new class of torpedo boat intended to be smaller and more manoeuvrable than the Imperial German Navy's latest torpedo boats, which would be more suitable for working with the fleet. Twelve ships were ordered from AG Vulcan and Germaniawerft (Note: The Imperial German Navy's practice was to split a year's orders into half-flotillas of six torpedo boats from different builders, to differing detailed design.) under the 1911 construction programme, while in 1912, twelve ships of similar design (S13–S24) were ordered from Schichau-Werke. The reduction in size resulted in the ships' seaworthiness being adversely affected, however, and range being reduced, with the 1911 and 1912 torpedo boats acquiring the disparaging nickname "Admiral Lans' cripples".

The Schichau boats were 71.5 m (234 ft 7 in) long overall and 71.0 m (232 ft 11 in) at the waterline, with a beam of 7.43 m (24 ft 5 in) and a draught of 2.77 m (9 ft 1 in). Displacement was 568 tonnes (559 long tons) normal and 695 tonnes (684 long tons) deep load. Three coal-fired and one oil-fired water-tube boilers fed steam to two direct-drive steam turbines rated at 15,700 metric horsepower (15,500 shp; 11,500 kW), giving a design speed of 32.5 knots (60.2 km/h; 37.4 mph). 108 tonnes (106 long tons) of coal and 72 tonnes (71 long tons) of oil were carried, giving a range of 1,050 nautical miles (1,940 km; 1,210 mi) at 17 knots (31 km/h; 20 mph) or 600 nautical miles (1,100 km; 690 mi) at 29 knots (54 km/h; 33 mph).

S24's armament consisted of two 8.8 cm (3.5 in) SK L/30 naval guns (Note: In Imperial German Navy gun nomenclature, the L/30 denotes the length of the gun. In this case, the L/30 gun is 30 caliber, meaning that the gun is 30 times as long as it is in diameter.) in single mounts fore and aft, together with four 50 cm (19.7 in) torpedo tubes with one reload torpedo carried. Up to 18 mines could be carried. In 1916, the guns were replaced by more powerful 8.8 cm SK L/45 naval guns, and in 1917 the ship was again rearmed, with two 10.5 cm L/45 guns.

The ship had a crew of 3 officers and 71 other ranks.

S24, yard number 875, was launched at Schichau's shipyard in Elbing, East Prussia (now Elbląg in Poland) on 28 June 1913 and was commissioned on 27 August 1913.

== Service ==
In May 1914, S24 was leader of the 7th Torpedo boat Flotilla, part of the German High Seas Fleet and remained in that position at the outbreak of the First World War in August 1914. The 7th Torpedo Boat Flotilla supported the Raid on Yarmouth on 3 November 1914 and the Raid on Scarborough, Hartlepool and Whitby on 16 December 1914. On 23 March 1915, the High Seas Fleet, escorted by a large force of torpedo boats, including the 7th Flotilla, carried out a sweep to the edge of the German Bight. S24 reported an enemy submarine, which caused the whole force to alter course, but the cause of the alert turned out to be caused by floating wood.

S24 was still leader of the 7th Torpedo boat flotilla when it sailed in support of the main German battle fleet for what became the Battle of Jutland on 31 May–1 June 1916. The majority of the 7th Flotilla, including S24, operated near the battleships of II Battle Squadron during the daytime engagements. During the night action, the 7th flotilla was ordered to search for and attack the British fleet, being allocated the sector to the south-east of the German fleet. The speed of the ships of the 7th flotilla, (and those of the 5th Flotilla, patrolling the adjacent sector) was limited to less than 17 kn (20 mph; 31 km/h) by the need to minimise the production of smoke and sparks which would give their location away in any confrontation at night, and by the tiredness of their stokers, as the ships had been operating at high speeds for most of the preceding day. As the British fleet had a night cruising speed of 17 knots, this would limit the 7th Flotilla's effectiveness. At about 20:50 Central European Time (CET), (Note: As used by the German Fleet - this was one hour ahead of Greenwich Mean Time.) the 7th torpedo boat flotilla encountered the British 4th Destroyer Flotilla. The German force at first mistook the British ships for the German 2nd Torpedo boat flotilla, but after no response was made when S24's challenged by flashing her recognition lights, an attack was launched, with S24, S15, S16 and S18 each firing a single torpedo (two of which passed close to the destroyer Garland) while the British ships replied with gunfire, but no ships were damaged and contact was soon lost. The two flotillas again briefly encountered each other at 23:42 hr, with S24 firing another torpedo, which missed the destroyer Unity. S24 later helped to escort the badly damaged battlecruiser Seydlitz.

In February 1917, S24 was one of ten torpedo boats that were transferred to the German naval forces based in Flanders, arriving in Belgium on 18 February, (Note: These were the large torpedo boats S25, S15, S18, S20, G95 and G96 and the smaller A-class coastal torpedo boats A39, A40, A42 and A45.) joining the 2nd Zeebrugge half-flotilla. On 25 February 1917, S24 carried out her first operation with the Flanders flotillas, being ordered, together with S18 and S20, to attack shipping between Britain and the Netherlands while six other torpedo boats attacked the patrols of the Dover Patrol and shelled Dover, while a third group of five torpedo boats attacked shipping near the North Foreland lightship. The attack was ineffective, with no shipping encountered. A second attack on the Channel was launched on the night of 17/18 March 1917, with the 2nd Zeebrugge half-flotilla (Note: S15, S18, S20 and S24.) being assigned to attack shipping in the Downs. S24's group swept past the drifters guarding the entrance to the Downs, firing at one of the drifters, the Paramount as they passed. Only a single merchant ship, the steamer SS Greypoint, which was suffering from engine problems was anchored in the Downs. S20 sank Greypoint with a torpedo while the force shelled Ramsgate and Broadstairs. Attacks by other torpedo boats against the Dover Barrage sank the British destroyer Paragon and badly damaged the destroyer Llewellyn. On the night of 20/21 April, S24 was one of 15 torpedo boats to be sent out in three groups against targets in the Channel, with S24, together with S15 and S20, being sent to attack the Downs. While two of the groups, including the one containing S20 returned to port without action, the third group was caught by British destroyers, with G42 and G85 sunk. On the night of 26/27 April, S24 took part in a raid by 15 Flanders-based torpedo boats in 3 groups with the intention of attacking shipping off the Thames Estuary. No shipping was found, and instead Margate, Broadstairs and Ramsgate were shelled, killing two people, wounding three more and damaging several houses. On 21 August 1917, S24 towed the badly damaged S15 back to port after S15 was mined when escorting minesweepers off the coast of Flanders. On 11 September 1917, S24, S17, V47, V68 and V69 left Flanders for Germany. S24 and S17 were to rejoin the High Seas Fleet, while the other three torpedo boats were being sent for repair before returning to Flanders.

Later in 1917, S24 joined an escort flotilla. On 17 November 1917, S24 formed part of the escort for the battleships Kaiser and Kaiserin which provided distant cover for German minesweeping operations in the Heligoland Bight. When British forces attacked the minesweeping force in the Second Battle of Heligoland Bight, Kaiser and Kaiserin came up to support the minesweeping force and allow its escape. At the end of the war S24 was a member of the 1st half-flotilla of the 1st Escort Flotilla.

While S24 was initially retained by Germany following the end of the war, she was one of the ships required to be surrendered under the terms of the Treaty of Versailles, replacing ships lost during the Scuttling of the German fleet at Scapa Flow in June 1919. S24 was one of 20 of the surrendered torpedo boats that were sent to Cherbourg in France in May–July 1920 to allow France and Italy to pick ships allocated under the treaty for commissioning with their navies. In the end, S24 was not picked, and with the remainder of the unsold ships, was transferred to Britain for disposal by scrapping, being sold on 22 October 1920. On 12 December 1920, S24 and the torpedo boat T189 were under passage to Teignmouth for scrapping when they ran aground off Torquay. S24 was towed off and taken away for scrapping, while T189 broke her back and could not be recovered.

In June 2023, scientists from the University of Winchester announced that they had found remnants of two ships, believed to be S24 and the British submarine E52, during a ground-penetrating radar survey of Coronation Park, Dartmouth, Devon, with Coronation Park being on land reclaimed from mudbanks on the River Dart which were used as a breaker's yard after the end of the First World War.

== Bibliography ==
- Campbell, John (1998). Jutland: An Analysis of the Fighting. London: Conway Maritime Press. ISBN 0-85177-750-3.
- Dodson, Aidan (2019). "Beyond the Kaiser: The IGN's Destroyers and Torpedo Boats After 1918". In Jordan, John (ed.). Warship 2019. Oxford, UK: Osprey Publishing. pp. 129–144. ISBN 978-1-4728-3595-6.
- Fock, Harald (1981). Schwarze Gesellen: Band 2: Zerstörer bis 1914 (in German). Herford, Germany: Koelers Verlagsgesellschaft mBH. ISBN 3-7822-0206-6.
- Fock, Harald (1989). Z-Vor! Internationale Entwicklung und Kriegseinsätze von Zerstörern und Torpedobooten 1914 bis 1939 (in German). Herford, Germany: Koehlers Verlagsgesellschaft mBH. ISBN 3-7822-0207-4.
- Gardiner, Robert; Gray, Randal, eds. (1985). Conway's All The World's Fighting Ships 1906–1921. London: Conway Maritime Press. ISBN 0-85177-245-5.
- Gladisch, Walter, ed. (1965). Der Krieg in der Nordsee: Band 7: Vom Sommer 1917 bis zum Kriegsende 1918 (in German). Frankfurt: Verlag E.S. Mittler & Sohn.
- Goldrick, James (2018). After Jutland: The Naval War in Northern European Waters, June 1916–November 1918. Barnsley, UK: Seaforth Publishing. ISBN 978-1-5267-4298-8.
- Gröner, Erich; Jung, Dieter; Maass, Martin (1983). Die deutschen Kriegsschiffe 1815–1945: Band 2: Torpedoboote, Zerstörer, Schnellboote, Minensuchboote, Minenräumboote (in German). Koblenz: Bernard & Graef Verlag. ISBN 3-7637-4801-6.
- Groos, O. (1924). Der Krieg in der Nordsee: Vierter Band: Von Unfang Februar bis Dezember 1915. Der Krieg zur See: 1914–1918. Berlin: Verlag von E. S. Mittler und Sohn – via National Library of Estonia.
- Karau, Mark K. (2014). The Naval Flank of the Western Front: The German MarineKorps Flandern 1914–1918. Barnsley, UK: Seaforth Publishing. ISBN 978-1-84832-231-8.
- Monograph No. 29: Home Waters Part IV: From February to July 1915 (PDF). Naval Staff Monographs (Historical). Vol. XIII. Naval Staff, Training and Staff Duties Division. 1925.
- Monograph No. 34: Home Waters—Part VIII.: December 1916 to April 1917 (PDF). Naval Staff Monographs (Historical). Vol. XVIII. Naval Staff, Training and Staff Duties Division. 1933.
- Newbolt, Henry (1928). Naval Operations: Volume IV. History of the Great War: Based on Official Documents. London: Longmans Green & Co.
- Rangelist der Kaiserlich Deutschen Marine für Das Jahr 1914 (in German). Berlin: Ernst Siegfried Mittler und Sohn. 1914 – via Heinrich Hein Universität Düsseldorf.
- Tarrant, V. E. (1997). Jutland: The German Perspective. London: Arms & Armour Press. ISBN 1-85409-442-4.
