= Action of 17 March 1917 =

Coordinates: 51.34°N 1.54°E

- Part of the First World War
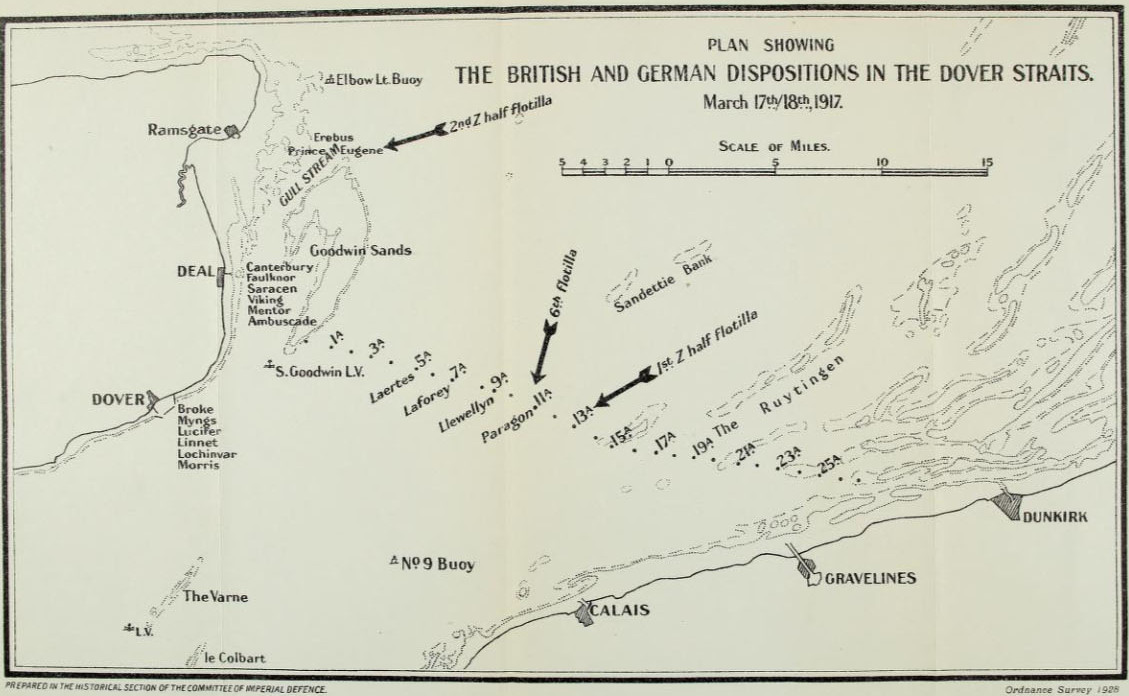
- British and German Dispositions in the Dover Straits 17th/18th March 1917
Date	17 March 1917
Location	Strait of Dover, English Channel
Result	German victory

Belligerents
Germany	United Kingdom

Commanders and leaders
Unknown	Richard Grenville Bowyer, Lieutenant, HMS Paragon.

Strength
8 torpedo boats	4 destroyers

Casualties and losses
None	1 destroyer sunk, Lieutenant Richard Grenville Bowyer + 1 destroyer damaged

The action of 17 March 1917 was a German raid on British shipping in the Strait of Dover as well as the harbours of Ramsgate and Margate. Two flotillas of German torpedo boats set out from the coast of Flanders and split. One group attacked the British drifters and destroyers patrolling near Goodwin Sands, while the other attacked the towns of Ramsgate and Margate, shelling the towns and shipping in their harbors. While attempting to fight off the German squadron near Goodwin Sands, the destroyers HMS Paragon and HMS Llewellyn were torpedoed. Paragon was sunk and Llewellyn damaged before the Germans withdrew with no casualties.
