= Utlängan =

Coordinates: 56°01′N 15°47′E

Utlängan is an island in the Karlskrona archipelago in Blekinge, Sweden.

== Geography ==
The island is situated the furthest out to sea of any of the archipelago's islands. Only the rock of Utklippan is situated further out. Utlängan is covered in woods and meadows, and is approximately 3 km (1.9 mi) long and 1.5 km (just short of a mile) across. The island covers just over 215 hectares (530 acres). Utlängans harbour, called Stenshamn, is an island in its own right and is linked by bridge to Utlängan proper. Utlängan features a tall observation tower which was once used by the Swedish military. The island also has a lighthouse, which is found to the south. A ferry service from Torhamn links the island to the Swedish mainland.

== History ==
The island was the starting point of a medieval sailing route to Estonia, known today as King Valdemar's sailing route.
