= V1-class destroyer =

Class of Imperial German Navy torpedo boats

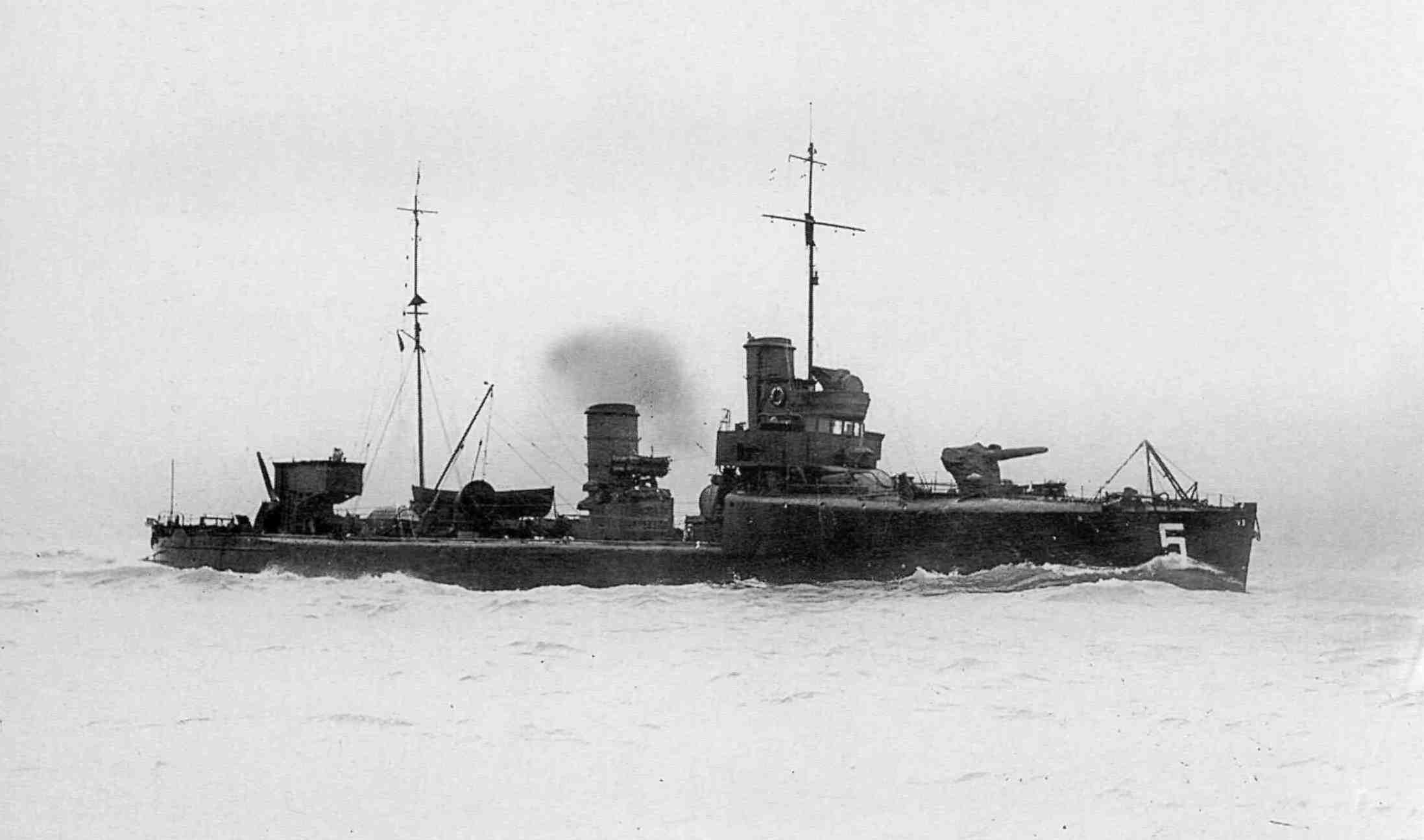
- SMS V5 underway

Class overview
- Name: V1 class
- Operators: Imperial German Navy; Royal Hellenic Navy; French Navy
- Planned: 26
- Completed: 26
- Lost: 8
- Retired: 18

General characteristics
- Type: Destroyer
- Displacement: 570 tonnes
- Length: 70.2 m (230.3 ft)
- Beam: 7.6 m (24.9 ft)
- Draught: 3.1 m (10.2 ft)
- Speed: 32 knots (59 km/h; 37 mph)
- Complement: 74 men and officers
- Armament: 2 × 8.8 cm (3.5 in)/30 guns; 4 × 50 cm (20 in) torpedo tubes

The German V1-class torpedo boats was a class of 26 large torpedo boats in service with the Imperial German Navy, Reichsmarine, Kriegsmarine and Royal Hellenic Navy in the early 20th century.

== Design ==
In 1911, the Imperial German Navy placed orders for a flotilla of twelve torpedo boats as part of its shipbuilding programme for that year, with one half flotilla of six ordered from AG Vulcan, and six from Germaniawerft. (Note: The Imperial German Navy's practice was to split a year's orders into half-flotillas of six torpedo boats from different builders, to differing detailed design.) The 1911 torpedo boats were smaller than those ordered in recent years in order to be more manoeuvrable and so work better with the fleet, which resulted in the numbering series for torpedo boats being restarted. The reduction in size resulted in the ships' seaworthiness being adversely affected, with the 1911 torpedo boats and the similar craft of the 1912 programme acquiring the disparaging nickname "Admiral Lans' cripples".

The six Vulcan-built ships, the V1 class, (Note: The "V" in V1 denotes the shipyard at which the ship was built.) ship was 71.1 metres (233 ft 3 in) long overall and 70.2 metres (230 ft 4 in) at the waterline, with a beam of 7.6 metres (24 ft 11 in) and a draught of 3.11 metres (10 ft 2 in). Displacement was 569 tonnes (560 long tons) normal and 697 tonnes (686 long tons) deep load. Three coal-fired and one oil-fired water-tube boilers fed steam to two direct-drive steam turbines rated at 17,000 metric horsepower (17,000 shp; 13,000 kW), giving a design speed of 32 knots (59 km/h; 37 mph). 107 tonnes (105 long tons) of coal and 78 tonnes (77 long tons) of oil were carried, giving a range of 1,190 nautical miles (2,200 km; 1,370 mi) at 17 knots (31 km/h; 20 mph) or 490 nautical miles (910 km; 560 mi) at 29 knots (54 km/h; 33 mph).

Armament consisted of two 8.8 cm (3.5 in)/30 naval guns (Note: In Imperial German Navy gun nomenclature, the L/30 denotes the length of the gun. In this case, the L/30 gun is 30 caliber, meaning that the gun is 30 times as long as it is in diameter.) in single mounts fore and aft, together with four 50 cm (19.7 in) torpedo tubes with one reload torpedo carried. Up to 18 mines could be carried. Crew was 74 officers and other ranks.

== Ships ==
=== Imperial German Navy ===
Vessel	Launched	Completed	Fate
V1	11 Sep 1911	12 Jan 1912	to Reichsmarine, 1919; stricken from the Fleet list, 27 Mar 1929; scrapped, Wilhelmshaven.
V2	14 Oct 1911	28 Mar 1912	to Reichsmarine, 1919; stricken from the Fleet list, 18 Nov 1929; scrapped, Wilhelmshaven.
V3	15 Nov 1911	2 May 1912	to Reichsmarine, 1919; stricken from the Fleet list, 18 Nov 1929; scrapped, Wilhelmshaven.
V4	23 Dec 1911	15 Jun 1912	sunk 03.20 hrs, 1 Jun 1916 during the Battle of Jutland 55°36′N 6°37′E (18 killed).
V5 (i)	22 May 1912	-	Sold to Greece, Jul 1912 as Keravnos; laid up 1919 and scrapped, 1921.
V6 (i)	29 Feb 1912	-	Sold to Greece, Jul 1912 as Nea Genea; laid up 1919 and scrapped, 1921.
G7	7 Nov 1911	30 Apr 1912	to Reichsmarine, 1919; Training vessel, 1936; re-designated T 107, 23 Apr 1939; to USSR, 1945 as Poražajuščij, later hulked; scrapped, 1957.
G8	21 Dec 1911	6 Aug 1912	to Reichsmarine, 1919; Training vessel, 1936; re-designated T 108, 23 Apr 1939; to UK, 6 Jan 1946; scrapped 1946.
G9	31 Jan 1912	25 Sep 1912	mined and sunk 04.15 hrs 3 May 1918 in 55°14′N 6°19′E (31 killed).
G10	15 Mar 1912	28 Aug 1912	to Reichsmarine, 1919; Training vessel, 1936; re-designated T 110, 23 Apr 1939; sunk, 5 May 1945 in the River Trave, Lübeck.
G11	23 Apr 1912	8 Aug 1912	to Reichsmarine, 1919; Training vessel, 1936; re-designated T 111, 23 Apr 1939; bombed and sunk, 3 Apr 1945 in Scheerhafen, Kiel.
G12	15 Juli 1912	17 Oct 1912	damaged in collision with V1, 06.00 hrs 8 Sep 1915 in 55°25′N 7°28′E and sunk following a torpedo explosion (47 killed).

1912 Program (VII Flotilla) On completion, these vessels formed the VII Torpedo Boat Flotilla of the High Seas Fleet.

Vessel	Launched	Completed	Fate
S13	7 Dec 1911	2 Jul 1912	sunk 08.56 hrs 6 Nov 1914 in 54°0′N 8°22′E following a torpedo explosion (9 killed).
S14	2 Mar 1912	1 Nov 1912	sunk by internal explosion, 19 Feb 1915 in the Jade in53°40′N 8°5′E (11 killed); raised, 1915 and scrapped, Wilhelmshaven.
S15	23 Mar 1912	1 Nov 1912	mined 21 Aug 1917 in the English Channel in 51°15′N 2°55′E; removed from service as beyond repair, 20 Sep 1917 and scrapped, Ghent.
S16	20 Apr 1912	1 Oct 1912	mined and sunk 18.15 hrs, 20 Jan 1918 in 54°41′N 2°55′E (80 killed).
S17	22 Jun 1912	7 Dec 1912	mined and sunk 16 May 1917 in 53°34′N 5°56′E (25 killed).
S18	10 Aug 1912	12 Jan 1913	to Reichsmarine, 1919; collided with battleship Hannover off Rugen, 23 May 1922 (10 killed); repaired; stricken from Fleet list, 1929; sold 31 Mar 1931 and scrapped, Kiel, 1935.
S19	17 Oct 1912	29 Mar 1913	to Reichsmarine, 1919; stricken from Fleet list, 1929; sold 31 Mar 1931; scrapped, Kiel, 1935.
S20	4 Dec 1912	1 Nov 1913	sunk in action with HMS Centaur, 04.00 hrs 5 Jun 1917 off Flanders Coast in 51°28′N 2°48′E (49 killed).
S21	11 Jan 1913	20 Jun 1913	rammed and sunk by SMS Hamburg 21 Apr 1915 in 53°47′N 08°09′E (36 killed).
S22	15 Feb 1913	23 Jul 1913	mined and sunk 21.35 hrs 26 Mar 1916 in 53°46′N 5°4′E (76 killed).
S23	29 Mar 1913	1 Nov 1913	to Reichsmarine, 1919; renumbered T 123 16 Mar 1932; renamed Komet, 23 Apr 1939; control vessel for radio-controlled target vessel Hessen; the fate since November 1944 is unknown.
S24	28 Jun 1913	27 Aug 1913	surrendered to the UK at Cherbourg, 28 Apr 1920; stranded on the south coast, 1920; later scrapped.

1912 Supplementary order Replacements for the two vessels sold to Greece in 1912.

Vessel	Launched	Completed	Fate
V5 (ii)	25 Apr 1913	17 Jul 1913	to Reichsmarine, 1919; deleted from Fleet list, 18 Nov 1929; scrapped, Wilhelmshaven.
V6 (ii)	28 Feb 1913;	17 May 1913	to Reichsmarine, 1919; deleted from Fleet list, 27 Mar 1929; scrapped, Wilhelmshaven

== History ==
The ships were ordered from Germany in 1912. The ships V1 through V4 served as V-class destroyers in the Imperial German Navy. The ships that served in the Greek Navy had been assigned German numbers V5 and V6, but were purchased before entering service in the German Navy, from the German shipyard Vulcan AG in Stettin, when the Balkan Wars were under-way (they were replaced in the German service with another V5 and V6). They were the first ships of the fleet that had steam turbines.

Silhouette of the V1 class

Later, during World War I, Greece belatedly entered the war on the side of the Triple Entente and, due to Greece's neutrality the two ex-German V-class ships were seized by the Allies in October 1916, taken over by the French in November and served in the French Navy from 1917–18. By 1918, they were back on escort duty under Greek colors, mainly in the Aegean Sea.

The two ships were stricken in 1919 and scrapped in 1922.
