= Naval drifter =

Type of boat

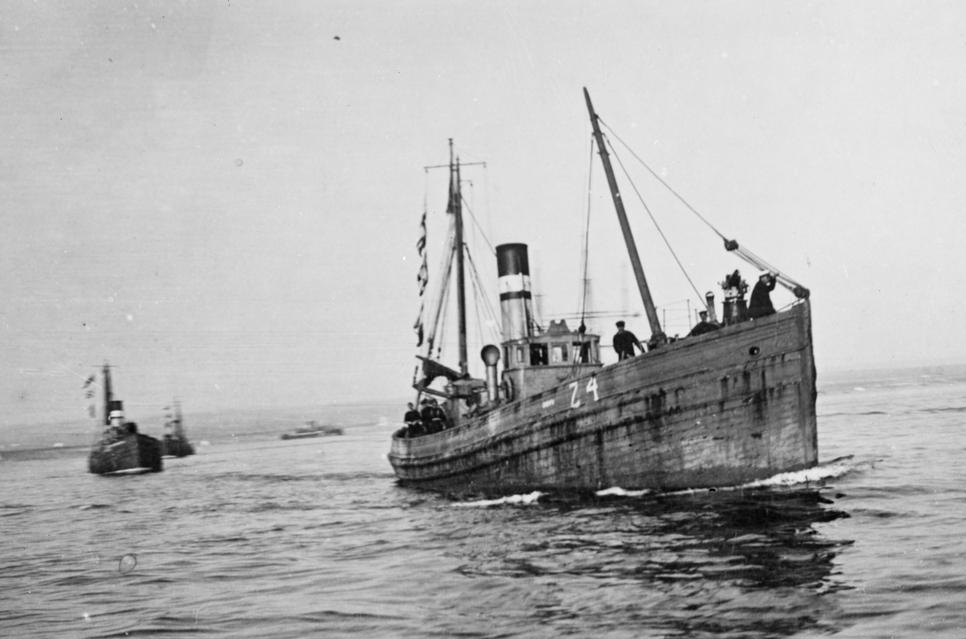
British drifters sailing from their base in the Adriatic to the Otranto Barrage

A naval drifter is a boat built along the lines of a commercial fishing drifter but fitted out for naval purposes. The use of naval drifters is paralleled by the use of naval trawlers.

Fishing trawlers were designed to tow heavy trawls, so they were easily adapted to tow minesweepers, with the crew and layout already suited to the task. Drifters were robust boats built, like trawlers, to work in most weather conditions, but designed to deploy and retrieve drift nets. They were generally smaller and slower than trawlers. If requisitioned by navies, they were typically armed with an anti-submarine gun and depth charges and used to maintain and patrol anti-submarine nets.

== World War I ==
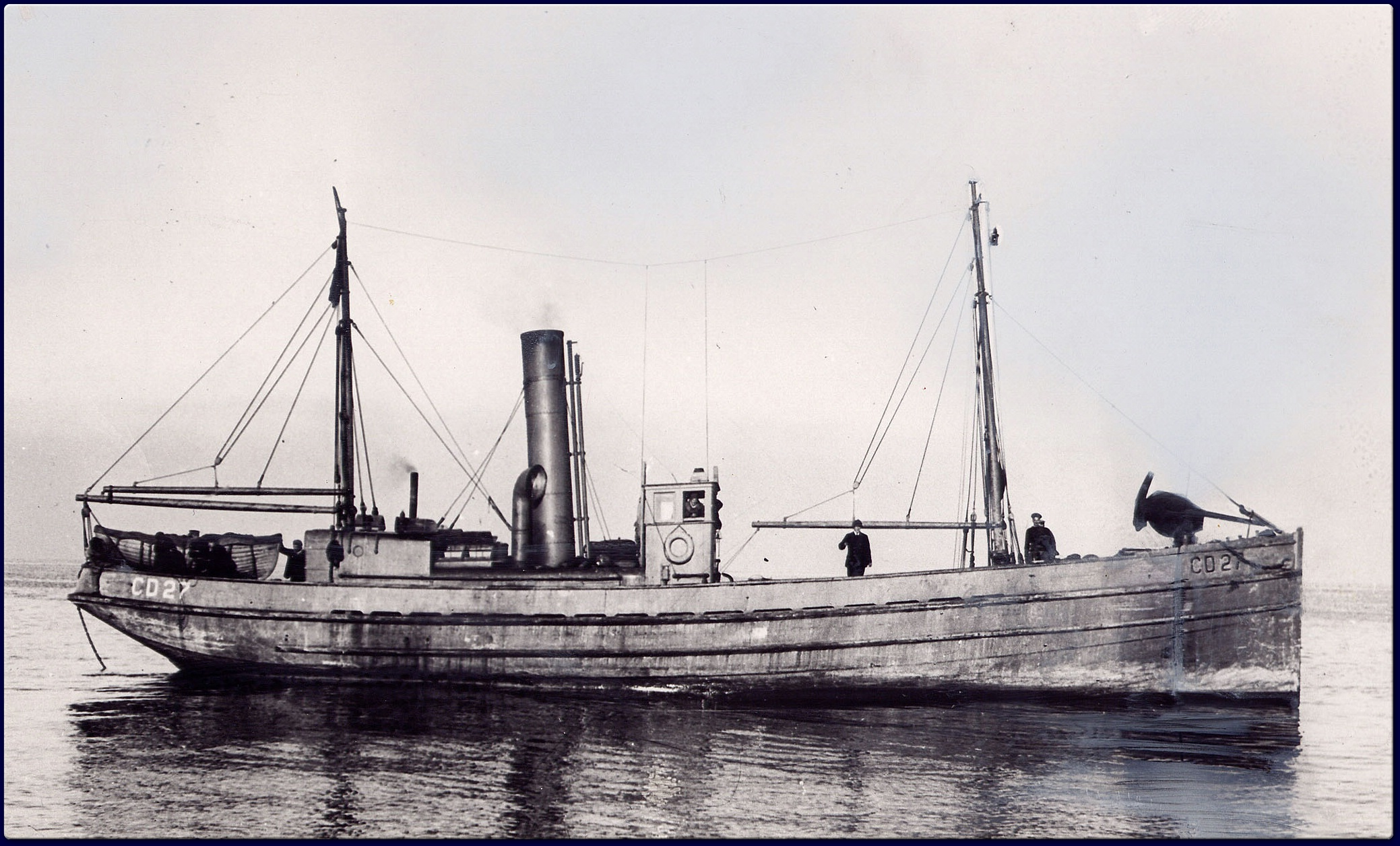
The Canadian CD-class naval drifter, CD 27, built during World War I for the Royal Canadian Navy. Many became fishing vessels after the war.

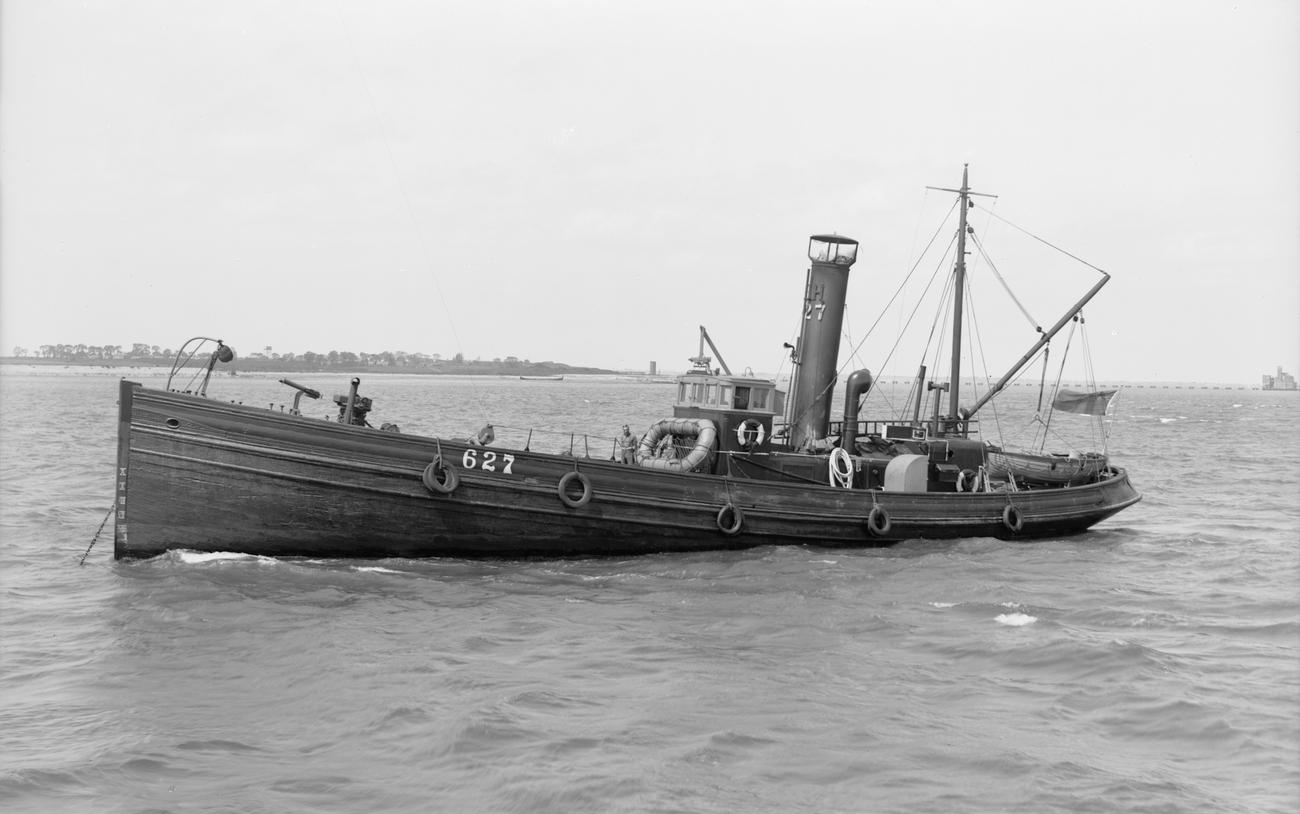
A Great Yarmouth drifter George Albert during the war

External image
- Photos of a World War I naval drifter

Like fishing trawlers, the Royal Navy requisitioned many fishing drifters for conversion to naval use during World War I.

In addition, 362 naval drifters were ordered to Admiralty specifications (and thus are often referred to as "Admiralty drifters"). Shipyards used to building fishing trawlers or drifters could easily switch to constructing naval versions. As a bonus these drifters could be sold to commercial fishing interests when the war ended.

There were two basic types of Admiralty-built drifters, wooden hulled and steel hulled.

- The wooden hull vessels displaced 175 tons, were 86 ft (26.2 m) long, with a beam of 19 ft (5.8 m). They had a speed of 9 knots and carried one 6 pounder gun. 91 wooden hull vessels were launched 1918–20, and 100 similar Canadian-built craft were ordered in January 1917.
- The steel hull vessels displaced 199 tons, were 86 ft (26.2 m) long, with a beam of 18 ft 6in (5.6 m). They also had a speed of 9 knots and carried a 6 pounder gun. 123 steel-hulled vessels were launched 1917–1920, and 48 others were cancelled.

Royal Navy drifters were named like the trawlers were, except for the Canadian-built vessels which were numbered CD 1 to CD 100.

During 1917, a fleet of British drifters, escorted by destroyers and light cruisers, maintained a blockade of the 72 km (45 mi) wide Strait of Otranto, denying the Austro-Hungarian Navy access to the Mediterranean. On 15 May 1917, the Austro-Hungarian Navy raided the barrage. The Austro-Hungarians gave most drifter crews warning to abandon ship before opening fire. Some drifter crews chose to fight, and the Gowan Lee returned fire on the Austro-Hungarian ships. The drifter was heavily damaged, but remained afloat. Skipper Joseph Watt was later awarded the Victoria Cross for his actions during the battle. Of the 47 drifters in the barrage at the time, 14 were sunk and 4 were damaged. The lack of sufficient Allied escorts forced the withdrawal of the remaining blockading ships, although only for a short time.

== See also ==
- Royal Naval Patrol Service
