= French ship Colmar =

At least two ships of the French Navy have been named Colmar:

- French cruiser Colmar, formerly the Kolberg-class cruiser SMS Kolberg acquired in 1920 and scrapped in 1929
- French minesweeper Colmar, an Agile-class minesweeper acquired in 1956 and scrapped in 1985
