= Kolberg-class cruiser =

Class of light cruisers of the German Imperial Navy

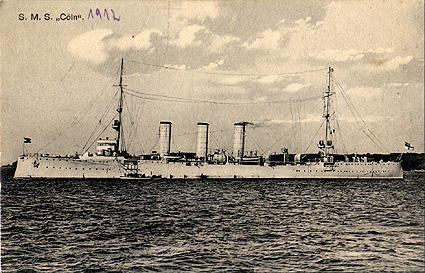
- SMS Cöln

Class overview
- Builders: AG Vulcan Stettin; Friedrich Krupp Germaniawerft; Kaiserliche Werft Kiel; Schichau-Werke
- Operators: Imperial German Navy; French Navy
- Preceded by: Dresden class
- Succeeded by: Magdeburg class
- In commission: 1909–1927
- Completed: 4
- Lost: 2
- Scrapped: 2

General characteristics
- Type: Light cruiser
- Displacement: Normal: 4,362 metric tons (4,293 long tons); Full load: 4,915 t (4,837 long tons)
- Length: 130.50 m (428 ft 2 in)
- Beam: 14 m (45 ft 11 in)
- Draft: 5.27–5.73 m (17 ft 3 in – 18 ft 10 in)
- Installed power: 19,000 shp (14,000 kW); 15 × boilers
- Propulsion: 4 × screw propellers; 4 × steam turbines
- Speed: 25.5 knots (47.2 km/h; 29.3 mph)
- Range: 3,500 nmi (6,500 km; 4,000 mi) at 14 knots (26 km/h; 16 mph)
- Complement: 367
- Armament: 12 × 1 - 105 mm (4.1 in) guns; 4 × 1 - 5.2 cm (2.0 in) guns; 2 × 450 mm (17.7 in) torpedo tubes
- Armor: Deck: 20–40 mm (0.79–1.57 in); Gun shields: 50 mm (2 in); Conning tower: 100 mm (3.9 in)

The Kolberg class was a group of four light cruisers built for the German Imperial Navy and used during the First World War. The class comprised four vessels: SMS Kolberg, the lead ship, Mainz, Cöln, and Augsburg. The ships were built between 1908 and 1910, and two, Kolberg and Augsburg, were modernized in 1916–1917. The ships were armed with a main battery of twelve 10.5 cm SK L/45 guns and had a design speed of 25.5 knots (47.2 km/h; 29.3 mph). The first three ships were assigned to the reconnaissance forces of the High Seas Fleet; Augsburg was instead used as a torpedo and gunnery training ship.

At the outbreak of war in August 1914, Augsburg was deployed to the Baltic, while Kolberg, Mainz, and Cöln remained in the North Sea. The three ships were assigned to patrol duty in the Heligoland Bight; on 28 August 1914, they were attacked during the Battle of Heligoland Bight. Mainz and Cöln were both sunk in the battle. Kolberg saw action at the Battle of Dogger Bank in January 1915, and joined Augsburg for the Battle of the Gulf of Riga in August 1915. Both ships also saw service during Operation Albion in October 1917. Both ships survived the war; Kolberg was ceded to France, where she was renamed Colmar and served in the French Navy until 1927. Augsburg was surrendered to Japan and was then sold for scrap.

== Design ==
=== General characteristics ===
Plan and profile drawing of the Kolberg class

The ships of the Kolberg class were 130 meters (430 ft) long at the waterline and 130.50 m (428 ft 2 in) long overall. They had a beam of 14 m (45 ft 11 in) and a draft of 5.45 to 5.73 m (17 ft 11 in to 18 ft 10 in) forward and 5.27 to 5.56 m (17 ft 3 in to 18 ft 3 in) aft. They displaced 4,362 metric tons (4,293 long tons) as designed, but the ships varied in their full-load displacement. Kolberg displaced 4,915 t (4,837 long tons) at full load; Mainz displaced 4,889 t (4,812 long tons), Cöln displaced 4,864 t (4,787 long tons), and Augsburg displaced 4,882 t (4,805 long tons).

The ships were steel-built; their hulls were constructed with longitudinal and transverse steel frames. The hulls contained thirteen watertight compartments and a double bottom that extended for fifty percent of the length of the keel. The ships were good sea boats, although they suffered from severe rolling and were fairly stiff. They were not very maneuverable and had a large turning radius. Steering was controlled by a single rudder. Their transverse metacentric height was .83 m (2 ft 9 in). The ships had a standard crew of 18 officers and 349 enlisted men and carried a number of smaller vessels, including one picket boat, one barge, one cutter, two yawls, and two dinghies.

=== Machinery ===
All four ships had slightly different propulsion systems in order to test engines from competing companies. Kolberg was equipped with two sets of Melms & Pfenniger steam turbines driving four three-bladed propellers 2.25 m (7 ft 5 in) in diameter. Mainz was powered by two AEG-Curtiss turbines driving a pair of three-bladed screws 3.45 m (11 ft 4 in) in diameter. Cöln initially had Zoelly turbines, though before sea trials, these were replaced with two sets of Germania turbines with four three-bladed screws; two were 2.55 m (8 ft 4 in) in diameter, and two were 1.78 m (5 ft 10 in) wide. Augsburg was equipped with two sets of Parsons turbines with four 3-bladed screws 2.25 m in diameter. All four ships were equipped with fifteen Marine type water-tube boilers, divided into four boiler rooms on the centerline. In 1916, Kolberg and Augsburg were equipped with supplementary oil-firing to increase the burn rate of the coal-fired boilers; Mainz and Cöln had been sunk by that time.

The ships' engines were designed to give 19,000 shaft horsepower (14,000 kW), with the exception of Mainz's engines, which were rated at 20,200 shp (15,100 kW). These were powered by fifteen coal-fired Marine water-tube boilers, which were trunked into three evenly spaced funnels. These gave the ships a top speed of 25.5 knots (47.2 km/h; 29.3 mph); Mainz's more powerful engines gave her a half-knot speed advantage. All four ships exceeded these figures on speed trials, however, and all four cruisers reached speeds in excess of 26 knots (48 km/h; 30 mph). Kolberg carried 970 t (950 long tons; 1,070 short tons) of coal, and after 1916, 115 t (113 long tons; 127 short tons) of oil. This gave her a maximum range of approximately 3,250 nautical miles (6,020 km; 3,740 mi) at 14 knots (26 km/h; 16 mph). Mainz carried 1,010 t (990 long tons; 1,110 short tons) of coal, which allowed her to steam for 3,630 nmi (6,720 km; 4,180 mi) at the cruising speed. Cöln carried 960 t (940 long tons; 1,060 short tons) of coal for a cruising radius of 3,500 nmi (6,500 km; 4,000 mi). Augsburg carried 940 t (930 long tons; 1,040 short tons), and had the same radius of action as Cöln.

=== Armament and armor ===
The ships were armed with a main battery of twelve 10.5 cm SK L/45 guns in single pedestal mounts. Two were placed side by side forward on the forecastle, eight were located amidships, four on either side, and two were side by side aft. For Kolberg and Augsburg, the 10.5 cm guns were replaced in 1916–1917 with six 15 cm SK L/45 guns. They also carried four 5.2 cm SK L/55 anti-aircraft guns, though these were replaced on the surviving ships with a pair of two 8.8 cm SK L/45 anti-aircraft guns in 1918. They were also equipped with a pair of 45 cm (17.7 in) torpedo tubes submerged in the hull. Two deck-mounted 50 cm (20 in) torpedo tube launchers were added to Kolberg and Augsburg in 1918. All four ships could also carry 100 mines.

The ships were protected with a combination of normal steel and Krupp cemented steel; the armor consisted of a layer of Krupp steel backed with two layers of steel. From stern to stem, the deck was covered with 20 mm (0.79 in) thick armor aft, 40 mm (1.6 in) thick armor plate over the machinery spaces, 20 mm thick armor forward of the machinery spaces, and 80 mm (3.1 in) on the bow. The coamings for the ships' funnels were 100 mm (3.9 in) thick. The conning tower had 100 mm thick sides and a 20 mm thick roof. The main battery guns were equipped with shields that were 50 mm (2.0 in) thick.

== Construction ==
Kolberg was ordered under the contract name Ersatz Greif and was laid down in early 1908 at the Schichau-Werke shipyard in Danzig under construction number 814. She was launched on 14 November 1908, after which fitting-out work commenced. She was commissioned into the High Seas Fleet on 21 June 1910. For the modifications in 1916–1917, Kolberg went into drydock at the Kaiserliche Werft in Kiel. Mainz was ordered as Ersatz Jagd and was laid down in 1907 at the AG Vulcan shipyard in Stettin. Built under construction number 288, she was launched on 23 January 1909, and was commissioned into the fleet on 1 October 1909.

Cöln was ordered under the contract name Ersatz Schwalbe and was laid down in 1908 at the Germaniawerft shipyard in Kiel. Her construction number was 191. She was launched on 5 June 1909, and after fitting-out was completed, she was commissioned into the fleet on 16 June 1911. Augsburg was ordered as Ersatz Sperber from the Kaiserliche Werft shipyard in Kiel. Her keel was laid in 1908 under building number 34. She was launched on 10 July 1909 and was commissioned into the fleet on 1 October 1910. She returned to the Kaiserliche Werft shipyard in Kiel for her modernization in 1916–1917.

Construction data
Name	Builder	Laid down	Launched	Commissioned	Fate
Kolberg	Schichau-Werke, Elbing	15 January 1908	14 November 1908	21 June 1910	Transferred to France as reparations, 28 April 1920
Mainz	AG Vulcan, Stettin	September 1907	23 January 1909	1 October 1909	Sunk during surface action, 28 August 1914
Cöln	Germaniawerft, Kiel	25 May 1908	5 June 1909	16 June 1911	Sunk during surface action, 28 August 1914
Augsburg	Kaiserliche Werft Kiel	August 1908	10 July 1909	1 November 1910	Surrendered to Japan as war prize, 3 September 1920

== Service history ==
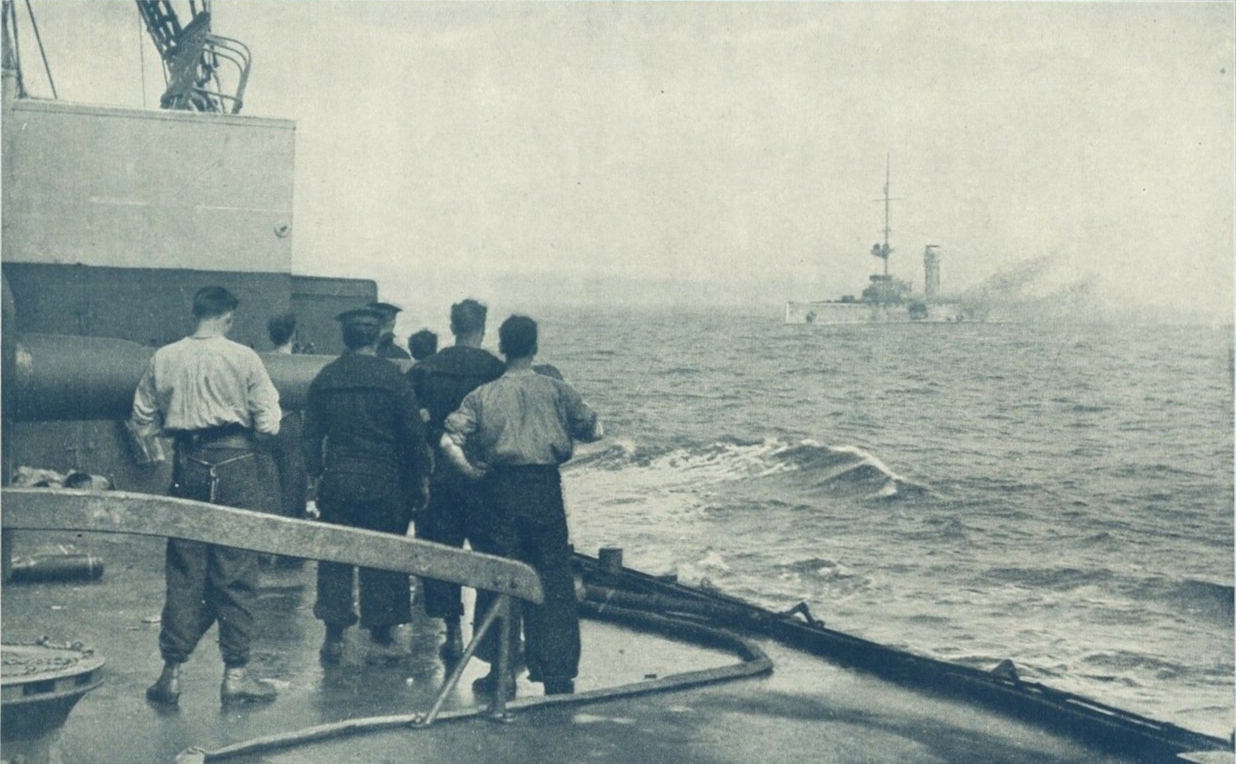
Mainz, badly damaged, moments before sinking

After their commissioning, Kolberg, Mainz, and Cöln were assigned to the II Scouting Group, part of the reconnaissance forces of the High Seas Fleet. Augsburg was instead used as a training ship for torpedo crews and gunnery. Cöln was assigned as the flagship of Rear Admiral Leberecht Maass. At the outbreak of World War I in August 1914, the II Scouting Group was deployed to a patrol line based on the island of Heligoland. Augsburg meanwhile was mobilized for active service and sent into the Baltic. There, she participated in an operation that saw the first shots of the war fired against the Russians, on 2 August.

On the morning of 28 August, the British Harwich Force, supported by the battlecruisers of Vice Admiral David Beatty's 1st Battlecruiser Squadron, broke into the Heligoland Bight and attacked the II Scouting Group patrols. In the confused action, Mainz and Cöln were sunk, by light cruisers and battlecruisers, respectively. The majority of crewmen from Mainz were picked up by the British ships, but Cöln was lost with only one survivor. Kolberg was stationed in port during the attack, and steamed out to support the beleaguered German forces, but the British had departed by the time she reached the scene.

Kolberg continued to serve with the reconnaissance forces in the North Sea, including seeing action at the raid on Scarborough, Hartlepool and Whitby in December 1914, where she laid a minefield off the British coast, and the Battle of Dogger Bank in January 1915. At Dogger Bank, she fired the first shots—and scored the first hits—of the engagement, at the cruiser HMS Aurora. Augsburg was meanwhile heavily engaged in the Baltic; in June 1915, she participated in a minelaying operation in the Gulf of Finland that saw the loss of the minelayer SMS Albatross.

Kolberg then joined her sister in the Baltic during the Battle of the Gulf of Riga in August 1915. During the operation, Kolberg and the battlecruiser Von der Tann bombarded Russian positions on Utö, while Augsburg steamed into the Gulf with the battleship Posen, where they sank a Russian gunboat and damaged another. By 19 August, the danger of British and Russian submarines in the Gulf prompted the Germans to withdraw. Augsburg participated in another, unsuccessful attempt to force the Gulf in late 1916. Both ships were present for Operation Albion, another large-scale assault on the Gulf of Riga, in October 1917. The ships were involved in a variety of operations, including minesweeping, and screening for the battleships König and Kronprinz while they destroyed Russian opposition in the Gulf. Men from Kolberg also landed on one of the islands to destroy a Russian gun battery.

Both ships survived the war. As part of the Treaty of Versailles, which ended the war, the ships were awarded to the victorious powers as war prizes. Kolberg was allocated to France, where she was commissioned into the French Navy as Colmar. Augsburg was transferred to Japanese control; having no use for her, they sold the ship for scrapping. Colmar saw one tour on colonial duty in Asia in 1924, where she participated in a multinational operation to protect foreign nationals from Chinese unrest in Shanghai. She was subsequently stricken in 1927 and broken up for scrap in Brest, France.
