= SMS Cöln (1909) =

Light cruiser of the German Imperial Navy

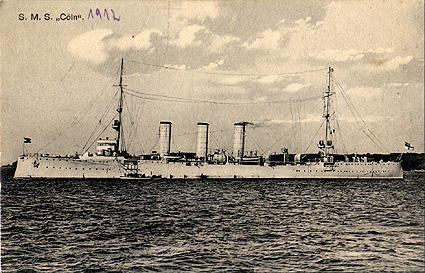
- SMS Cöln

History

German Empire
- Name: Cöln
- Namesake: Cologne
- Laid down: 1908
- Launched: 5 June 1909
- Completed: 16 June 1911
- Fate: Sunk during the Battle of Heligoland Bight, 28 August 1914

General characteristics
- Class & type: Kolberg-class cruiser
- Displacement: Normal: 4,362 metric tons (4,293 long tons); Full load: 4,864 t (4,787 long tons)
- Length: 130.5 m (428.1 ft)
- Beam: 14 m (45.9 ft)
- Draft: 5.38–5.58 m (17 ft 8 in – 18 ft 4 in)
- Installed power: 19,000 shp (14,000 kW); 15 × boilers
- Propulsion: 4 × screw propellers; 4 × steam turbines
- Speed: 25.5 knots (47.2 km/h; 29.3 mph)
- Range: 3,500 nmi (6,500 km; 4,000 mi) at 14 knots (26 km/h; 16 mph)
- Complement: 18 officers; 349 enlisted men
- Armament: 12 × 1 - 10.5 cm (4.1 in) SK L/45 guns; 2 × 450 mm (17.7 in) torpedo tubes
- Armor: Deck: 20–40 mm (0.79–1.57 in); Gun shields: 50 mm (2 in); Conning tower: 100 mm (3.9 in)

SMS Cöln ("His Majesty's Ship Cologne") (Note: "SMS" stands for "Seiner Majestät Schiff" (German: His Majesty's Ship)) was a Kolberg-class light cruiser of the German Kaiserliche Marine (Imperial Navy) during the First World War. She had three sister ships, SMS Kolberg, Mainz, and Augsburg. She was built by the Germaniawerft in Kiel; her hull was laid down in 1908 and she was launched in June 1909. Cöln was commissioned into the High Seas Fleet in June 1911. She was armed with a main battery of twelve 10.5 cm SK L/45 guns and had a top speed of 25.5 kn (47.2 km/h; 29.3 mph). After her commissioning, she served with the II Scouting Group, part of the reconnaissance forces of the High Seas Fleet.

Cöln was assigned to patrols off the island of Heligoland at the outbreak of World War I in early August 1914, as the flagship of Rear Admiral Leberecht Maass. At the Battle of Heligoland Bight on 28 August 1914, the German patrol forces were attacked by superior British forces, including five battlecruisers and several light cruisers. Cöln was initially stationed in support of the forces on the patrol line. She attempted to reinforce the beleaguered German forces, and encountered Vice Admiral David Beatty's battlecruisers. She was hit several times by the battlecruisers' large-caliber guns, but managed to escape in the haze. She inadvertently turned back toward them, however, and was quickly disabled when the battle resumed. The crew abandoned Cöln, but German vessels did not search the area for three days, and only one man survived.

== Design ==
The Kolberg class of light cruisers were a development of the preceding Dresden class. The primary objective during their design process was to increase speed over the earlier vessels; this required a longer hull to fit an expanded propulsion system. Their armament remained the same as the earlier ships, but they received a new, longer-barreled 10.5 cm (4.1 in) SK L/45 gun instead of the shorter SK L/40 version of the gun. In addition, the new cruisers abandoned the pronounced ram bow that featured in all previous German light cruisers, and instead used a straight stem.

Plan and profile drawing of the Kolberg class

Cöln was 130.5 meters (428 ft) long overall and had a beam of 14 m (46 ft) and a draft of 5.73 m (18.8 ft) forward. She displaced 4,362 metric tons (4,293 long tons) normally and up to 4,864 t (4,787 long tons; 5,362 short tons) at full load. The ship had a forecastle deck that extended for the first third of the hull, which stepped down to main deck level for the central portion of the ship before stepping back up to a short sterncastle. She had a minimal superstructure that consisted of a small conning tower on the forecastle. The ship carried a pair of pole masts with platforms for searchlights, one directly aft of the conning tower, and the other closer to her stern. Cöln had a crew of eighteen officers and 349 enlisted men.

Cöln was initially to be powered by two sets of Zoelly steam turbines manufactured by Escher Wyss & Cie. in Zürich. Her propulsion system was revised and instead consisted of two sets of Germaniawerft steam turbines driving four screw propellers. They were designed to give 19,000 shaft horsepower (14,000 kW). Steam was provided by fifteen coal-fired Marine water-tube boilers, which were vented through three funnels placed amidships. These gave the ship a top speed of 25.5 knots (47.2 km/h; 29.3 mph). Cöln carried 960 t (940 long tons; 1,060 short tons) of coal that gave her a range of approximately 3,500 nautical miles (6,500 km; 4,000 mi) at 14 knots (26 km/h; 16 mph).

Cöln was armed with a main battery of twelve 10.5 cm (4.1 in) SK L/45 guns in single pedestal mounts. Two were placed side by side forward on the forecastle; eight were located on the broadside, four on either side; and two were side by side aft. She also carried four 5.2 cm (2 in) SK L/55 anti-aircraft guns. She was also equipped with a pair of 45 cm (17.7 in) torpedo tubes submerged in the hull. She could also carry 100 mines.

The ship was protected by an armor deck that was 20 to 40 mm (0.79 to 1.57 in) thick, and which curved downward at the sides to provide a measure of protection against enemy fire. Her conning tower had 100 mm (3.9 in) thick sides, and the main battery guns were fitted with gun shields that were 50 mm (2 in) thick.

== Service history ==
Cöln was ordered under the contract name Ersatz Schwalbe, (Note: German warships were ordered under provisional names. Additions to the fleet were given a single letter; ships intended to replace older or lost vessels were ordered as "Ersatz (name of the ship to be replaced)".) and was laid down on 25 May 1908 at the Germaniawerft shipyard in Kiel. She was launched on 5 June 1909 and christened by the mayor of Cöln, Max Wallraf, after which fitting-out work commenced. During the builders' sea trials, the Zoelly turbines were found to be poor quality and they were replaced with Germaniawerft-produced models. This work significantly delayed her completion. She was commissioned into the High Seas Fleet on 16 June 1911, and she began her acceptance trials. These were interrupted by a fleet parade for Kaiser Wilhelm II on 5 September. On 10 October, she was assigned to the II Scouting Group, which screened for the battlecruisers of the I Scouting Group. She participated in the normal peacetime routine of individual, squadron, and fleet exercises and cruises over the next two years without incident. Fregattenkapitän Hans Zenker served as her commander from October 1911 to September 1913.

From 28 August to 21 September, she served as the flagship for Konteradmiral (Rear Admiral) Franz von Hipper, then the deputy commander of the reconnaissance forces, while Hipper was temporarily displaced from his usual flagship, the battlecruiser Von der Tann. Hipper left briefly, but returned on 26 September and remained aboard through the following year. During the autumn fleet maneuvers in September 1913, Cöln attempted to warn the crew of zeppelin L 1 of the deteriorating weather conditions, but they did not receive the message. As a result, the zeppelin crashed off the island of Helgoland. After the conclusion of the maneuvers, Hipper lowered his flag, and he was replaced by Kommodore (Commodore) Leberecht Maass. The year 1914 began with the normal training routine, but as tensions rose following the assassination of Archduke Franz Ferdinand of Austria on 28 June forced the cancellation of the planned fleet exercises for the end of July. Starting on 30 July, as war loomed, Cöln was stationed in the German Bight to monitor maritime traffic.

After the outbreak of World War I at the beginning of August 1914, she and several other cruisers were tasked with patrol duties in the Heligoland Bight. The cruisers were divided with the torpedo boat flotillas, and assigned to rotate through nightly patrols into the North Sea. From 1 to 7 August, Cöln lay in the Schillig roadstead. She thereafter went to the mouth of the Weser, where she was joined by the cruiser Hamburg and the IV Torpedo-boat Flotilla. As part of the patrol operations, Cöln conducted a sortie on the night of 15 August with Stuttgart and the I and II Torpedo-boat Flotillas, without incident.

=== Battle of Heligoland Bight ===
The actions of Mainz in the Battle of Heligoland (German perspective)

At the same time, British submarines began reconnoitering the German patrol lines. On 23 August, several British commanders submitted a plan to attack the patrol line with the light cruisers and destroyers of the Harwich Force, commanded by Commodore Reginald Tyrwhitt. These ships would be supported by submarines and Vice Admiral David Beatty's battlecruisers and associated light forces. The plan was approved and set for 28 August. The British forces began to leave port on the evening of 26 August, beginning with the submarines assigned to the operation. Most of the surface forces went to sea early on the following morning; the 7th Cruiser Squadron, which had been added to provide further support to the Harwich Force, left port later in the day.

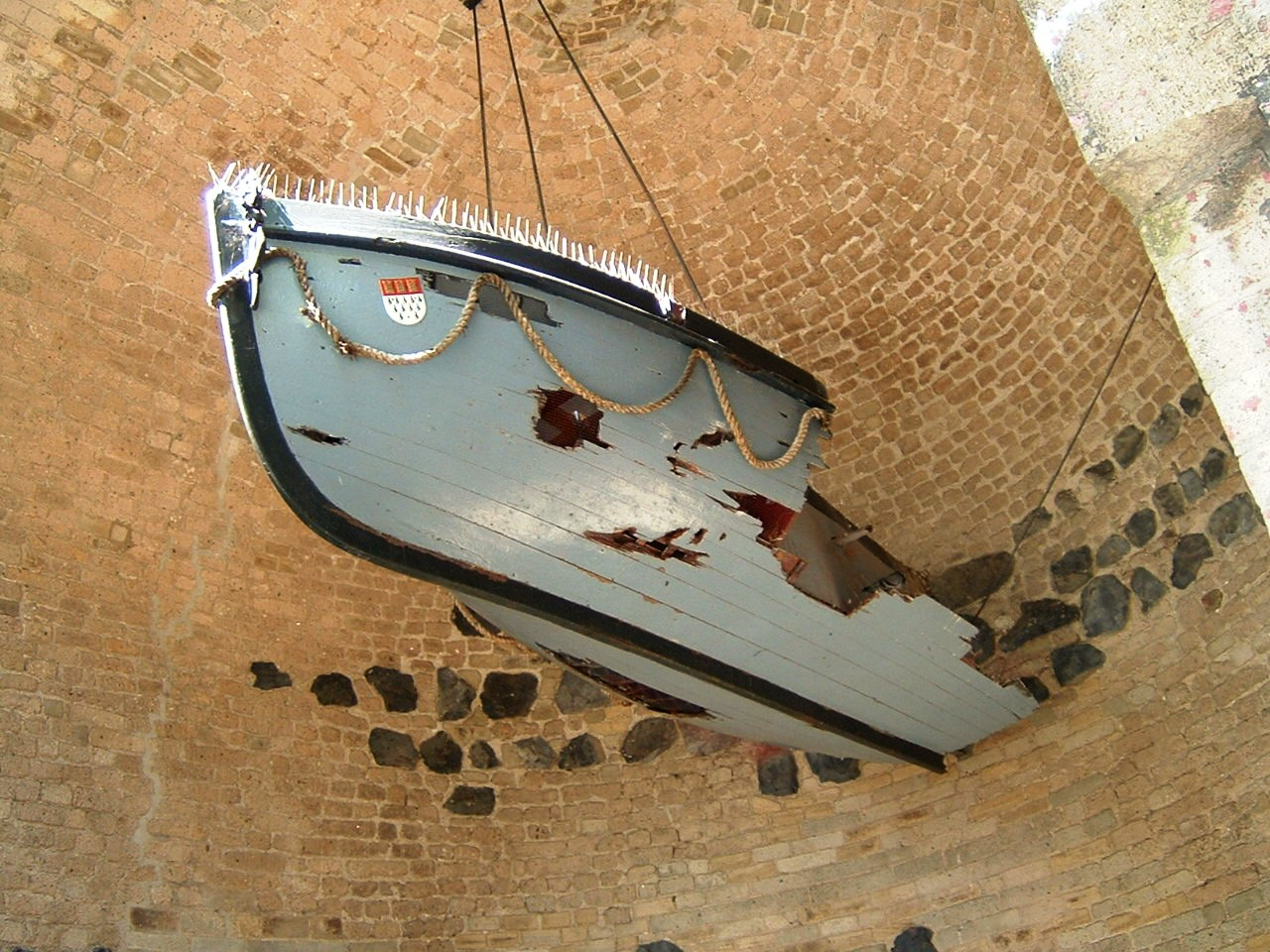
Wrecked cutter from Cöln recovered after the battle

On the morning of 28 August, Cöln was re-coaling in Wilhelmshaven. Her sister, Mainz, was at anchor in the mouth of the Ems, and Ariadne lay in the entrance to the Weser. These three cruisers were assigned to support the cruisers Stettin and Frauenlob, and the aviso Hela, which were stationed on the patrol line that morning. At 07:57, the Harwich Force encountered the outer German torpedo boats, which fled back to the German cruisers on the patrol line. In the ensuing Battle of Heligoland Bight, Stettin engaged the British force first, and was quickly reinforced by Frauenlob. Upon receiving reports of the action, Hipper ordered Maass to deploy his cruisers to support the engaged vessels. At 09:30, Cöln steamed out of port.

Cöln steamed to aid her sister Mainz, which was under heavy fire from several British cruisers and battlecruisers. At around 13:25, she came upon the damaged cruiser HMS Arethusa and several destroyers. Cöln engaged the British ships briefly, but was interrupted by the appearance of the British battlecruisers. At 13:37, Cöln made a 16-point turn and returned fire at the battlecruisers; the British ships turned to port to steam closer to Cöln, which in turn similarly altered course to escape. She was hit several times, however, including one hit that killed Maass. At 13:56, another German cruiser arrived on the scene, which distracted the British ships and allowed Cöln to slip away to the north. About fifteen minutes later, she turned back south-east to return to port.

The reversal of course brought her back in range of the British battlecruisers, however, which quickly opened fire and scored several damaging hits. The order to abandon ship was given, and men began gathering on the deck. Engineers set scuttling charges while the men topside prepared to go into the water. At 14:25, the ship rolled over and sank. The survivors expected the British to pick them up, but they had instead departed the battlefield. German ships searched the area three days later, to find only one survivor, Leading Stoker Neumann; the rest of the crew had died in the meantime. The wreck was moved in August 1979 to render it less of an underwater hazard. Some parts of the ship were salvaged and are now preserved in the Cuxhaven Shipwreck Museum.
