= SMS Mainz =

Light cruiser of the German Imperial Navy

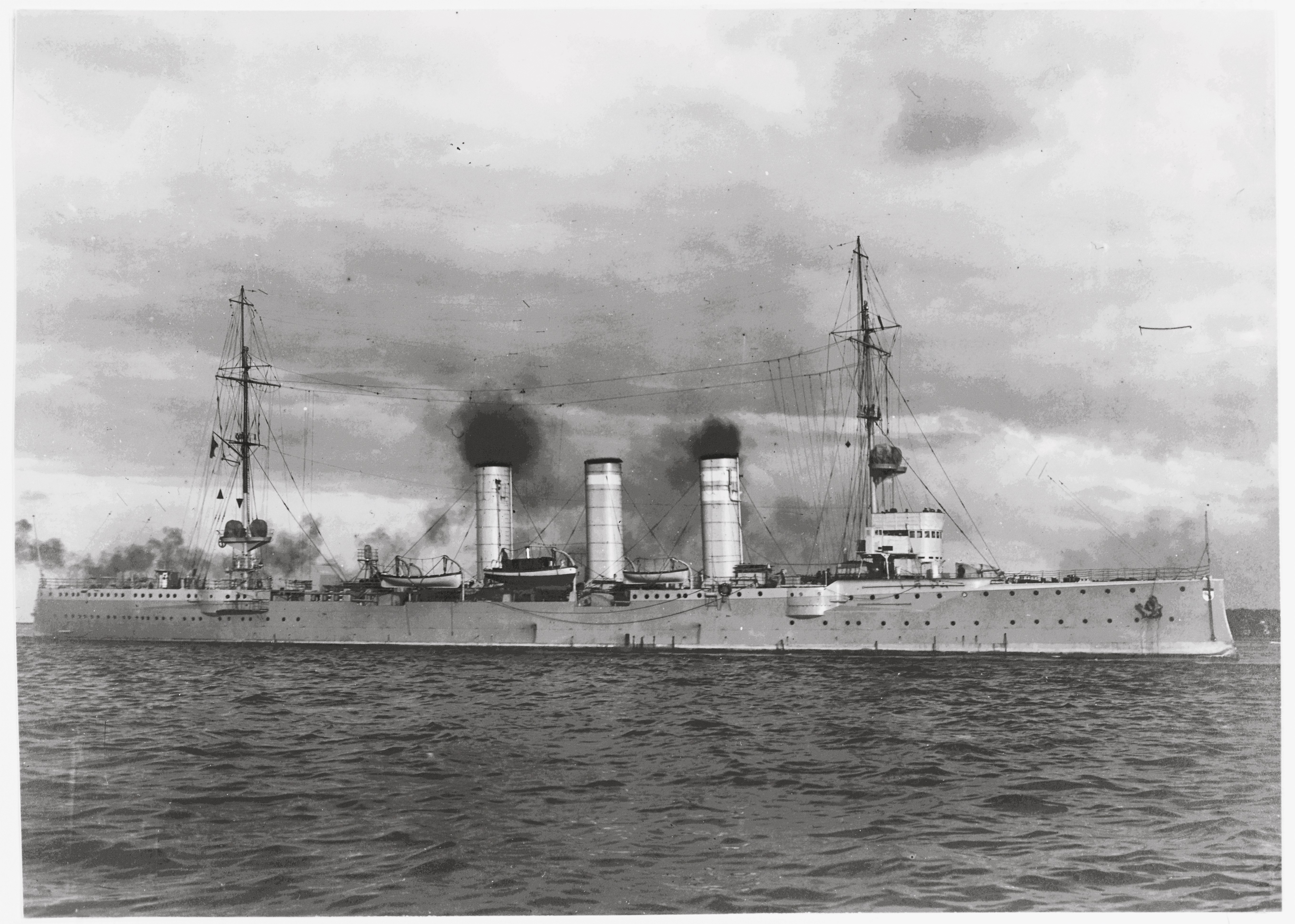
- Mainz, c. 1910

History

German Empire
- Name: Mainz
- Namesake: Mainz
- Builder: AG Vulcan Stettin
- Laid down: September 1907
- Launched: 23 January 1909
- Commissioned: 1 October 1909
- Fate: Sunk during the Battle of Heligoland Bight, 28 August 1914

General characteristics
- Class & type: Kolberg-class cruiser
- Displacement: Normal: 4,362 metric tons (4,293 long tons); Full load: 4,889 t (4,812 long tons)
- Length: 130.5 m (428.1 ft)
- Beam: 14 m (45.9 ft)
- Draft: 5.38–5.58 m (17 ft 8 in – 18 ft 4 in)
- Installed power: 20,200 shp (15,100 kW); 15 × boilers
- Propulsion: 2 × screw propellers; 2 × steam turbines
- Speed: 26 knots (48 km/h; 30 mph)
- Range: 3,630 nmi (6,720 km; 4,180 mi) at 14 knots (26 km/h; 16 mph)
- Complement: 18 officers; 349 enlisted men
- Armament: 12 × 10.5 cm (4.1 in) SK L/45 guns; 4 × 5.2 cm (2.0 in) SK L/55 guns; 2 × 450 mm (17.7 in) torpedo tubes
- Armor: Deck: 20–40 mm (0.79–1.57 in); Gun shields: 50 mm (2 in); Conning tower: 100 mm (3.9 in)

SMS Mainz was a Kolberg-class light cruiser of the German Kaiserliche Marine (Imperial Navy) during the First World War. She had three sister ships, SMS Kolberg, Cöln, and Augsburg. She was built by the AG Vulcan shipyard in Stettin; her hull was laid down in 1908 and she was launched in January 1909. She was commissioned into the High Seas Fleet in October 1909. She was armed with a main battery of twelve 10.5 cm SK L/45 guns and had a top speed of 25.5 kn (47.2 km/h; 29.3 mph).

After her commissioning, she served with II Scouting Group, part of the reconnaissance forces of the High Seas Fleet. She was assigned to patrols off the island of Heligoland at the outbreak of World War I in early August 1914. At the Battle of Heligoland Bight on 28 August 1914, the German patrol forces were attacked by superior British forces, including five battlecruisers and several light cruisers. Mainz was initially stationed in support of the forces on the patrol line. She attempted to reinforce the beleaguered German forces, and encountered a much stronger force of British cruisers and destroyers. They scored several damaging hits with gunfire and a torpedo that disabled Mainz and prompted her commander to abandon ship. The British rescued 348 men from the crew before the ship rolled over and sank. Eighty-nine men were killed in the battle, including her commanding officer.

== Design ==
Mainz at anchor

Plan and profile drawing of the Kolberg class

The Kolberg class of light cruisers were a development of the preceding Dresden class. The primary objective during their design process was to increase speed over the earlier vessels; this required a longer hull to fit an expanded propulsion system. Their armament remained the same as the earlier ships, but they received a new, longer-barreled 10.5 cm (4.1 in) SK L/45 gun instead of the shorter SK L/40 version of the gun. In addition, the new cruisers abandoned the pronounced ram bow that featured in all previous German light cruisers, and instead used a straight stem.

Mainz was 130.5 meters (428 ft) long overall and had a beam of 14 m (46 ft) and a draft of 5.58 m (18.3 ft) forward. She displaced 4,362 metric tons (4,293 long tons) normally and up to 4,889 t (4,812 long tons; 5,389 short tons) at full load. The ship had a forecastle deck that extended for the first third of the hull, which stepped down to main deck level for the central portion of the ship before stepping back up to a short sterncastle. She had a minimal superstructure that consisted of a small conning tower on the forecastle. The ship carried a pair of pole masts with platforms for searchlights, one directly aft of the conning tower, and the other closer to her stern. Mainz had a crew of eighteen officers and 349 enlisted men.

Her propulsion system consisted of two sets of AEG-Curtiss steam turbines driving two 3.45-meter (11.3 ft) screw propellers. They were designed to give 20,200 shaft horsepower (15,100 kW). Steam was provided by fifteen coal-fired Marine water-tube boilers, which were vented through three funnels placed amidships. These gave the ship a top speed of 26 knots (48 km/h; 30 mph). Mainz carried 1,010 t (990 long tons; 1,110 short tons) of coal that gave her a range of approximately 3,630 nautical miles (6,720 km; 4,180 mi) at 14 knots (26 km/h; 16 mph).

The ship was armed with a main battery of twelve 10.5 cm (4.1 in) SK L/45 guns in single pedestal mounts. Two were placed side by side forward on the forecastle; eight were located on the broadside, four on either side; and two were side by side aft. She also carried four 5.2 cm (2 in) SK L/55 anti-aircraft guns. She was also equipped with a pair of 45 cm (17.7 in) torpedo tubes submerged in the hull. She could also carry 100 mines.

The ship was protected by an armor deck that was 20 to 40 mm (0.79 to 1.57 in) thick, and which curved downward at the sides to provide a measure of protection against enemy fire. Her conning tower had 100 mm (3.9 in) thick sides, and the main battery guns were fitted with gun shields that were 50 mm (2 in) thick.

== Service history ==
Illustration of Mainz by Oscar Parkes, 1910

Mainz was ordered under the contract name Ersatz Jagd, (Note: German warships were ordered under provisional names. Additions to the fleet were given a single letter; ships intended to replace older or lost vessels were ordered as "Ersatz (name of the ship to be replaced)".) and was laid down in September 1907 at the AG Vulcan shipyard in Stettin. She was launched on 23 January 1909 and christened by the Oberburgermeister (Mayor) of Mainz, Karl Göttelmann, after which fitting-out work commenced. She was commissioned into the High Seas Fleet on 1 October 1909 and began sea trials on 23 October; these were interrupted from 24 November to 17 January 1910 and again from 23 February to 19 May for additional work in the yard because her performance was unsatisfactory. On 6 June, Mainz joined the reconnaissance force of the High Seas Fleet, taking the place of the light cruiser Danzig. She was assigned to II Scouting Group, which screened for the battlecruisers of I Scouting Group. Her first commander was Fregattenkapitän (Frigate Captain) Friedrich Tiesmeyer, the uncle of Ernst Lindemann; he held the command until January 1910.

Over the course of the following three years, Mainz participated in all of the cruises and training exercises of the High Seas Fleet. These activities began with the annual summer cruise went to Norway, which was followed by fleet training upon the fleet's return to German waters. During the exercises a fleet review was held in Danzig on 29 August. A training cruise into the Baltic followed at the end of the year. In March 1911, the fleet conducted exercises in the Skagerrak and Kattegat. Mainz and the rest of the fleet received British and American naval squadrons in Kiel in June and July. The year's autumn maneuvers were confined to the Baltic and the Kattegat. Another fleet review was held during the exercises for a visiting Austro-Hungarian delegation that included Archduke Franz Ferdinand and Admiral Rudolf Montecuccoli. Also during these maneuvers, Mainz won the Kaiser's Schießpreis (Shooting Prize) for excellent shooting among vessels in II Scouting Group. Her crew also took first place in a cutter race.

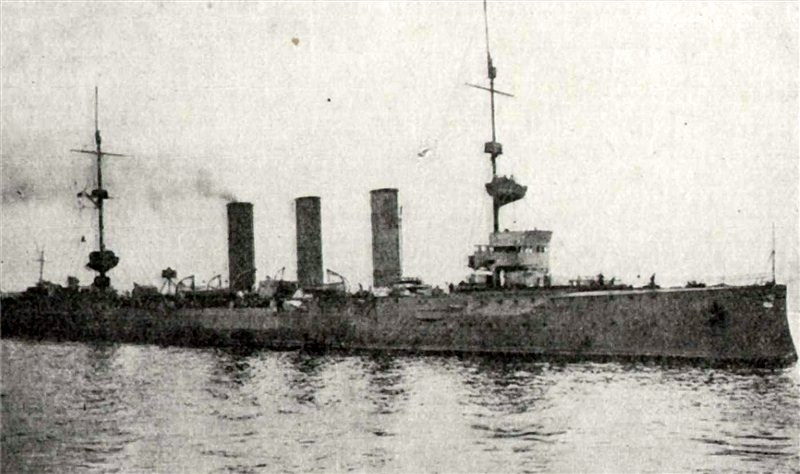
Mainz before the war

In mid-1912, due to the Agadir Crisis, the summer cruise only went into the Baltic to avoid exposing the fleet during the period of heightened tension with Britain and France. During this period, Fregattenkapitän Heinrich Retzmann served as the ship's commander from October 1912 to January 1913. Retzmann left Mainz when she went into drydock for an extensive overhaul that lasted until mid-June. She thereafter returned to II Scouting Group. The High Seas Fleet again hosted a British squadron in June 1914, days before the assassination of Archduke Franz Ferdinand. On 5 July, Kaiser Wilhelm II arrived in Kiel to join the fleet for the annual summer cruise to Norway, where the fleet conducted training exercises as Europe drifted to war. By 29 July, days before the outbreak of World War I, the fleet was back in Germany.

=== World War I ===
After the outbreak of World War I at the beginning of August 1914, the cruiser Arcona was the only vessel on station to guard the German Bight. Mainz and IV Torpedo-boat Flotilla were immediately dispatched on 3 August to reinforce the defenses. Other cruisers were also sent to strengthen the forces that were tasked with patrol duties in the southern portion of the German Bight, the Heligoland Bight. The cruisers were divided with the torpedo boat flotillas and were assigned to rotate through nightly patrols into the North Sea. As part of this operation, Mainz conducted a patrol on the night of 16 August with the VIII Torpedo-boat Flotilla, without incident. At the same time, British submarines began reconnoitering the German patrol lines. On the night of 21–22 August, Mainz provided distant support to a patrol of torpedo boats that inspected fishing vessels in the Dogger Bank. Another foray into the North Sea followed on 23 August; Mainz and the torpedo boats escorted a group of minelayers that laid a series of minefields off the mouths of the River Tyne and the Humber before returning to port on 26 August.

==== Battle of Heligoland Bight ====
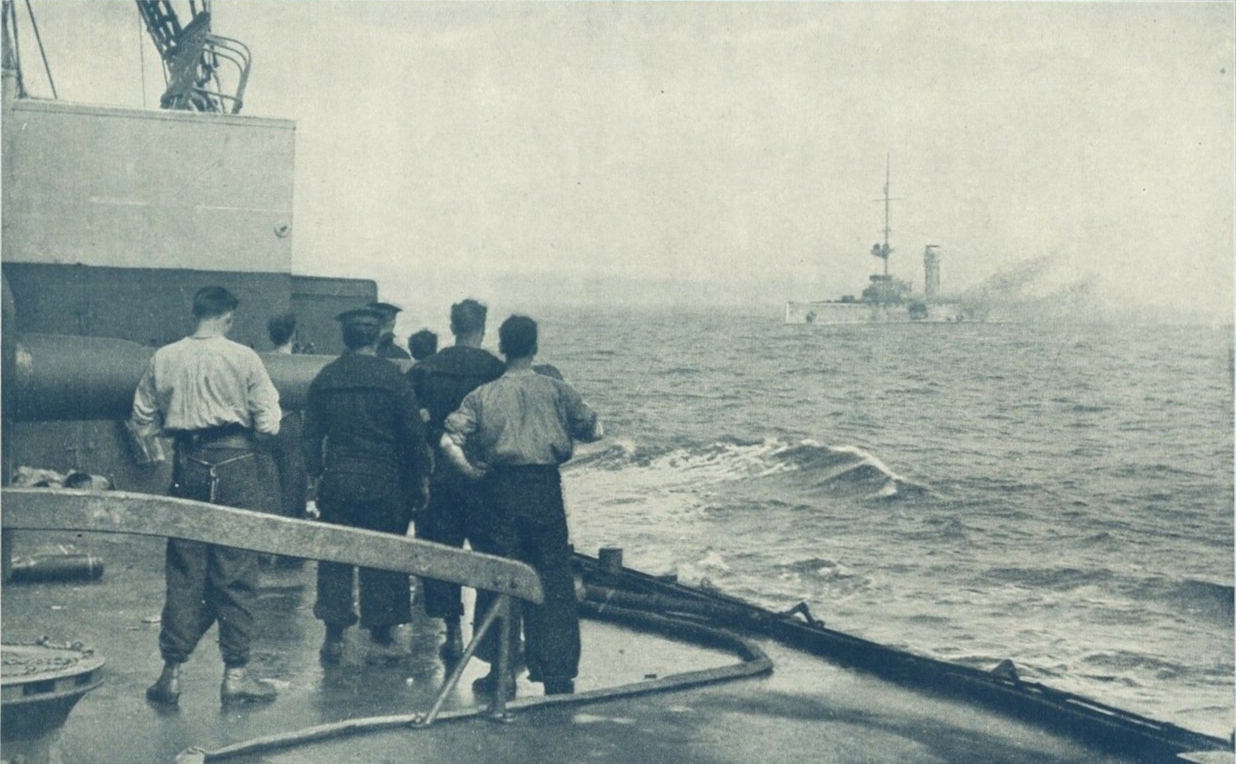
British sailors watch the badly damaged Mainz on fire, moments before sinking

Meanwhile, on 23 August, several British commanders submitted a plan to attack the patrol line with the light cruisers and destroyers of the Harwich Force, commanded by Commodore Reginald Tyrwhitt. These ships would be supported by submarines and Vice Admiral David Beatty's battlecruisers and associated light forces. The plan was approved and set for 28 August. The British forces began to leave port on the evening of 26 August, beginning with the submarines assigned to the operation. Most of the surface forces went to sea early on the following morning; the 7th Cruiser Squadron, which had been added to provide further support to the Harwich Force, left port later in the day.

On the morning of 28 August, Mainz was at anchor in the mouth of the Ems; her sister Cöln, the flagship of Konteradmiral (Rear Admiral) Leberecht Maass was re-coaling in Wilhelmshaven, Ariadne lay in the entrance to the Weser. These three cruisers were assigned to support the cruisers Stettin and Frauenlob, and the aviso Hela, which were stationed on the patrol line that morning. At 07:57, the Harwich Force encountered the outer German torpedo boats, which fled back to the German cruisers. In the ensuing Battle of Heligoland Bight, Stettin engaged the British force first, and was quickly reinforced by Frauenlob. At 09:47, Mainz was ordered to steam out behind the British to cut off their line of retreat. She got under way by 10:00, and operated in conjunction with a floatplane used for reconnaissance.

At around 12:30, Mainz encountered the British cruiser Arethusa and several destroyers. The ships engaged each other for the next forty-five minutes. Fifteen minutes into the engagement, three British cruisers appeared; Mainz broke off the engagement and attempted to escape from the superior British forces. The pursuing British cruisers scored several hits, but by 12:55, Mainz had escaped under cover of a dense smoke screen. Another British cruiser, Fearless, and six destroyers, appeared on Mainz's port side, however, and attacked the fleeing German ship. Mainz quickly scored hits on the destroyers Laurel, Liberty and Laertes; Laurel was damaged and forced to withdraw and Laertes was disabled by a salvo that hit her engine room.

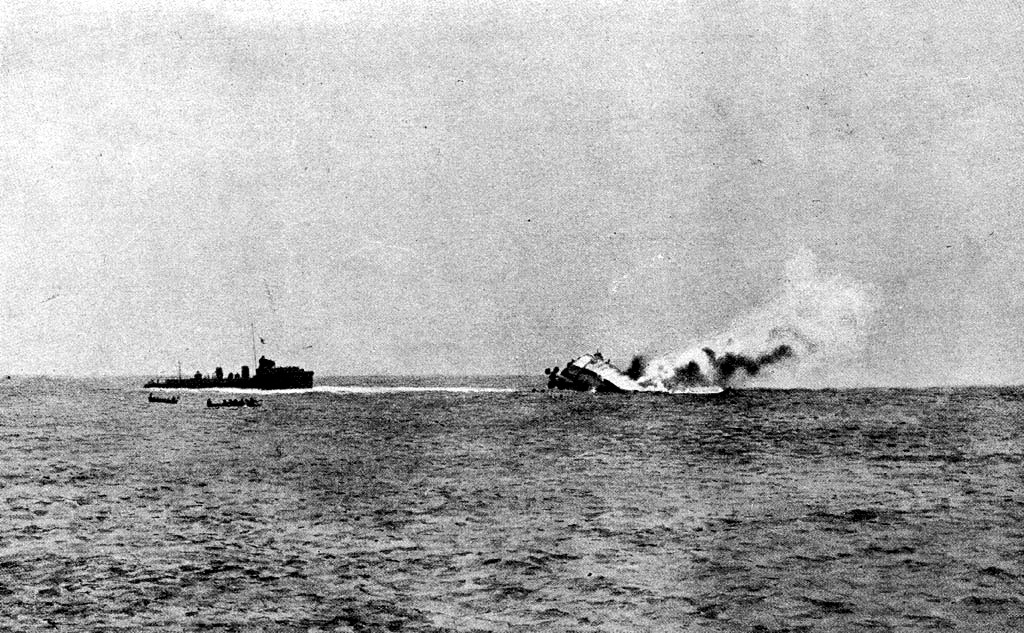
Mainz sinking on 28 August 1914

A shell from one of the British cruisers hit Mainz at around 13:00, which jammed her rudder at ten degrees to starboard. Her crew shut off the port engine in an attempt to correct the ship's course, but she continued to turn to starboard. By 13:20, the majority of the ship's guns had been disabled and the ship's superstructure had been shot to pieces. Her center and aft funnel collapsed after suffering several hits. A torpedo from the destroyer Lydiard then hit the ship on her port side, amidships; this prompted the ship's commander to order the crew to abandon the stricken cruiser. He then left the conning tower with the navigation officer, both of whom were immediately killed by a shell hit. The ship's communication system was out of service, and so the order to abandon ship did not reach the entire crew. The ship's executive officer then reached the bridge, and reiterated the order to abandon the crippled ship at 13:35.

Mainz was by now completely disabled. Her engines were stopped and her guns had ceased firing. Shortly before 14:00, Lurcher came alongside and took off the wounded German sailors. At 14:10, Mainz rolled over to port and quickly sank at the position 53°58' N and 6°42' E; the survivors now in the water gave three cheers for their ship. The British rescued 348 survivors who were then taken prisoner; 89 men, including the ship's commander, were killed in the battle. Among the survivors was Oberleutnant zur See (Sub-Lieutenant) Wolfgang von Tirpitz, the son of Großadmiral (Grand Admiral) Alfred von Tirpitz, the architect of the German fleet. Tirpitz was picked up by a boat and taken to the light cruiser Liverpool. Winston Churchill, then the First Lord of the Admiralty, informed Tirpitz via the United States' embassy in Berlin that his son survived the battle and had not been injured. In the course of the engagement, the British sank two more German cruisers—Ariadne and Cöln—with minimal losses to themselves.

Mainz at the Battle of Heligoland Bight

The actions of Mainz in the battle

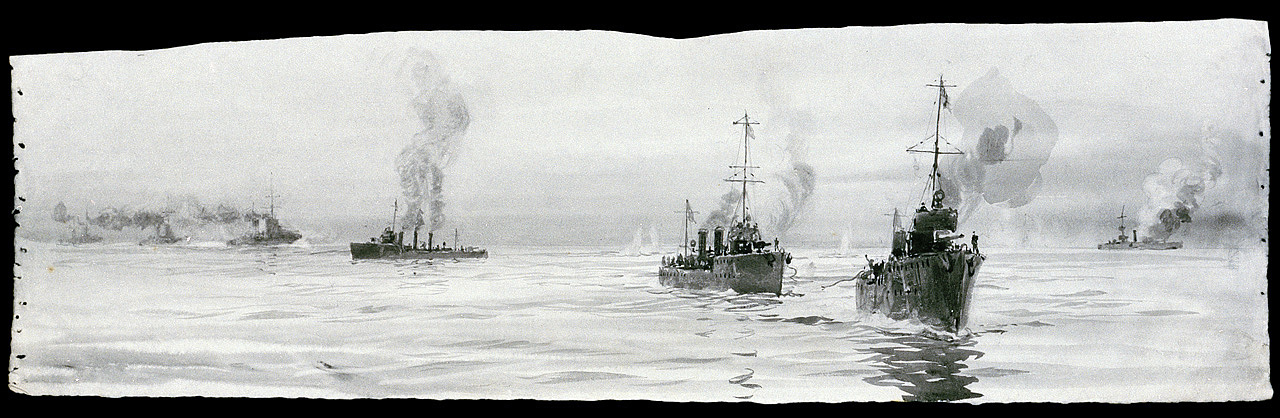
Sketch of British ships engaging Mainz in the distance

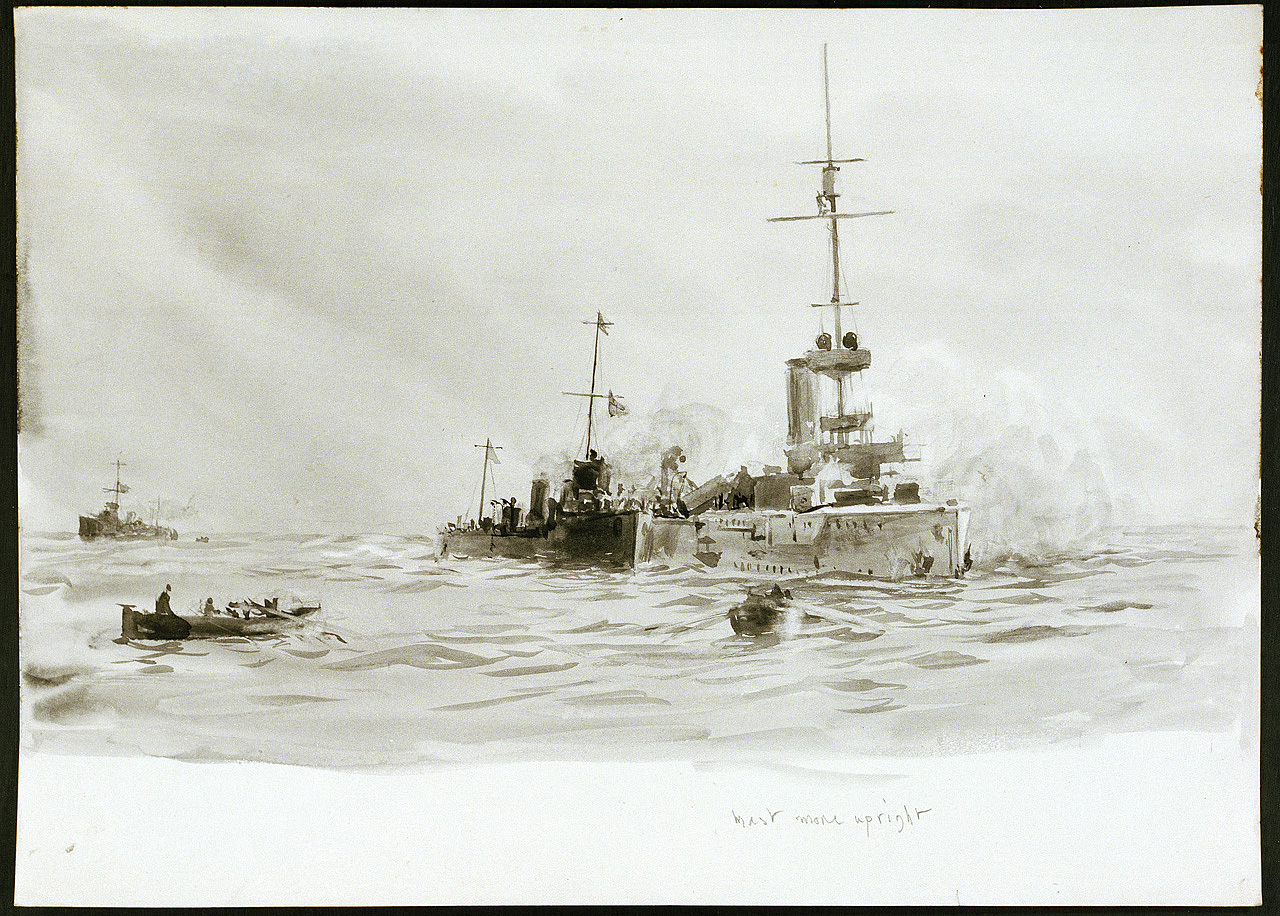
HMS Lurcher alongside Mainz, taking off survivors

== Wreck ==
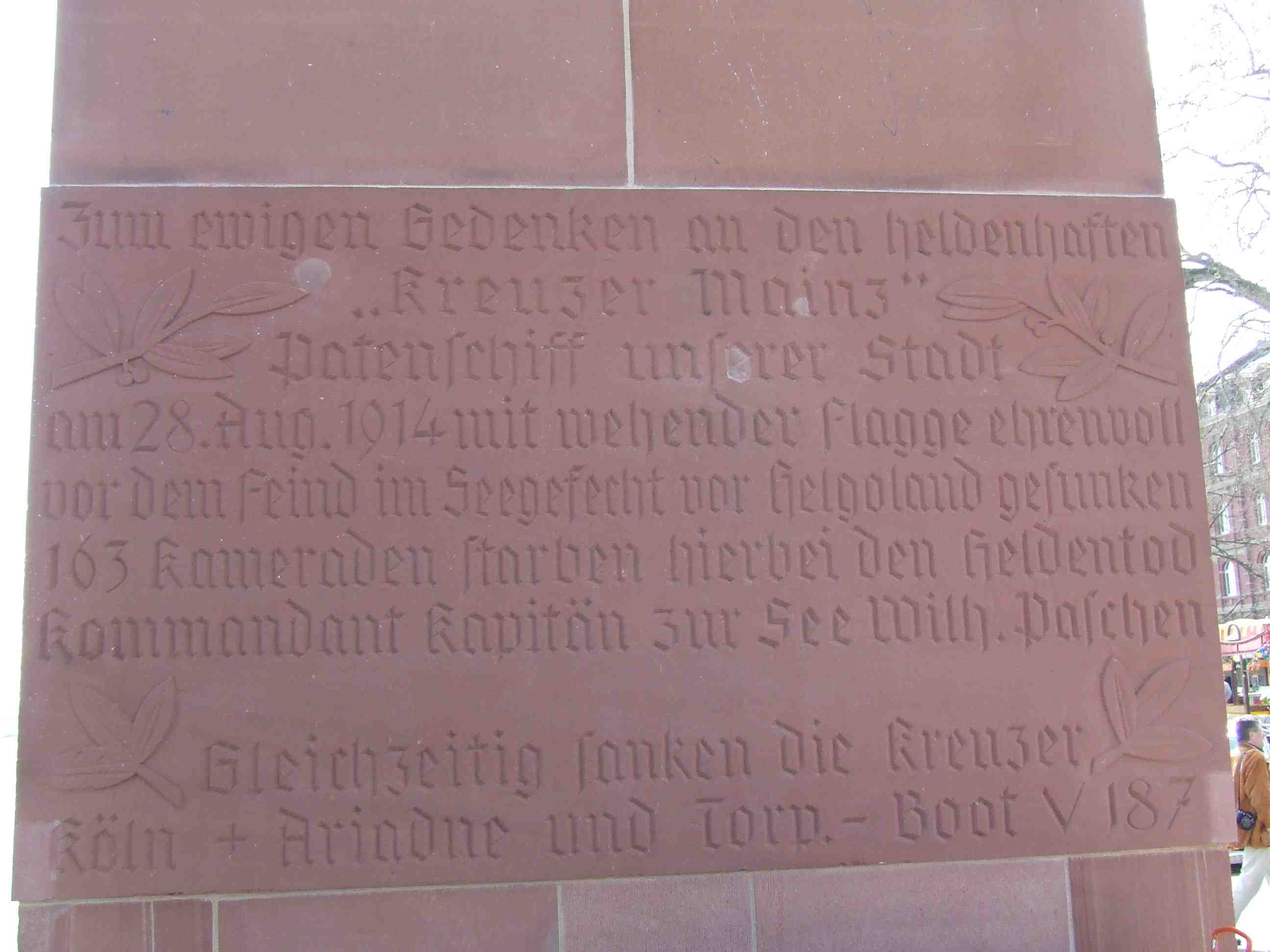
Part of the SMS Mainz memorial in Mainz

In August 2015, members of the Dutch sport-diving club Duikteam Zeester dove on Mainz's wreck and retrieved a variety of prosaic artifacts, including a sextant, the engine telegraph, and a sight for one of her guns. Their actions provoked criticism from German sources, who noted that the wreck was a war grave containing the remains of 89 crew members and thus should not be disturbed. The German Federal Police investigated the incident. The German police spent three years investigating the dive team and searching for the artifacts. Finally, in August 2018, the divers and the German government reached an agreement, whereby the divers are recognized as the discoverers of the wreck in exchange for returning the artifacts they had taken from the wreck. The objects are to be exhibited in the Bundeswehr Military History Museum in Dresden. Henk Bos, one of the dive team members, stated that exhibiting the artifacts in a museum "...is all we wanted. So in the end, we are happy with this outcome."
