= Budzieszowce =

- Village
- Location within Poland
- Coordinates: 53°31′42″N 15°0′26″E
- Country: Poland
- Voivodeship: West Pomeranian
- County: Goleniów
- Gmina: Maszewo

Budzieszowce [bud͡ʑɛˈʂɔft͡sɛ] (German: Korkenhagen) is a village in the administrative district of Gmina Maszewo, within Goleniów County, West Pomeranian Voivodeship, in north-western Poland. It lies approximately 7 km (4 mi) north-west of Maszewo, 13 km (8 mi) east of Goleniów, and 31 km (19 mi) north-east of the regional capital Szczecin.

For the history of the region, see History of Pomerania.

== Notable residents ==
- Leberecht Maass (1863–1914), admiral
