= SMS Augsburg =

Light cruiser of the German Imperial Navy

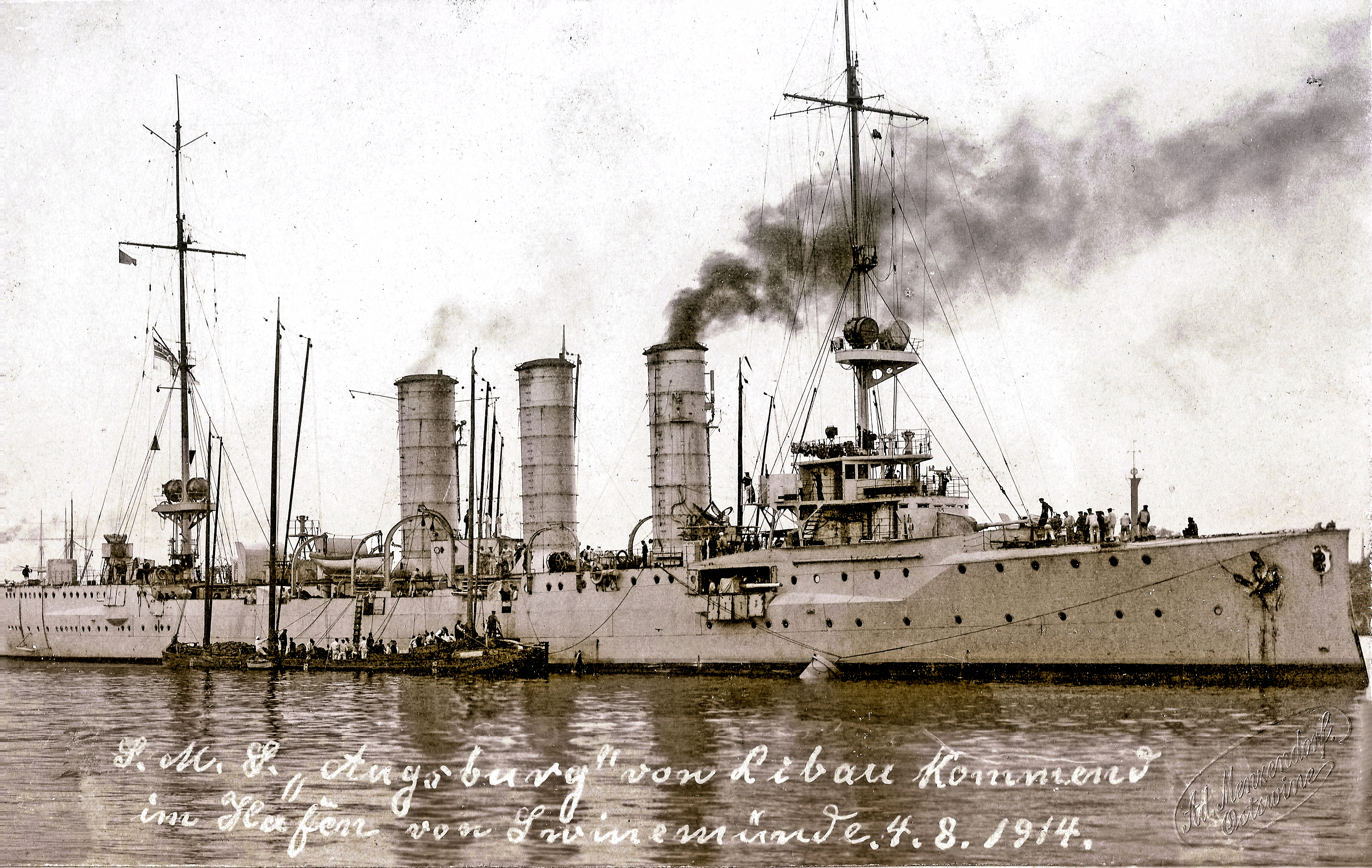
- Augsburg at anchor, 4 August 1914

History

German Empire
- Name: SMS Augsburg
- Namesake: Augsburg
- Laid down: 22 August 1908
- Launched: 10 July 1909
- Commissioned: 1 October 1910
- Decommissioned: 17 December 1918
- Fate: Scrapped, 1922

General characteristics
- Class & type: Kolberg-class cruiser
- Displacement: Normal: 4,362 metric tons (4,293 long tons); Full load: 4,882 t (4,805 long tons)
- Length: 130.50 m (428 ft 2 in)
- Beam: 14 m (45 ft 11 in)
- Draft: 5.38–5.58 m (17 ft 8 in – 18 ft 4 in)
- Installed power: 19,000 PS (19,000 shp); 15 × boilers
- Propulsion: 4 × screw propellers; 4 × steam turbines
- Speed: 25 knots (46 km/h; 29 mph)
- Complement: 367
- Armament: 12 × 1 – 10.5 cm SK L/45 guns; 2 × 45 cm (17.7 in) torpedo tubes
- Armor: Deck: 20–40 mm (0.79–1.57 in); Gun shields: 50 mm (2 in); Conning tower: 100 mm (3.9 in)

SMS Augsburg was a Kolberg-class light cruiser of the German Kaiserliche Marine (Imperial Navy) during the First World War. She had three sister ships, SMS Kolberg, Mainz, and Cöln. The ship was built by the Kaiserliche Werft in Kiel; her hull was laid down in 1908 and she was launched in July 1909. Augsburg was commissioned into the High Seas Fleet in October 1910. She was armed with a main battery of twelve 10.5 cm SK L/45 guns and had a top speed of 25.5 knots (47.2 km/h; 29.3 mph).

After her commissioning, Augsburg spent her peacetime career first as a torpedo test ship and then as a gunnery training ship. After the outbreak of World War I, she was assigned to the Baltic Sea, where she spent the entire war. On 2 August 1914, she participated in an operation that saw the first shots of the war with Russia fired, and she later took part in the Battle of the Gulf of Riga in August 1915 and Operation Albion in October 1917, as well as numerous smaller engagements throughout the war. She struck a mine, once, in January 1915, though the ship was again operational in a few months. After the end of the war, Augsburg was ceded to Japan as a war prize, and was subsequently broken up for scrap in 1922.

== Design ==
The Kolberg class of light cruisers were a development of the preceding Dresden class. The primary objective during their design process was to increase speed over the earlier vessels; this required a longer hull to fit an expanded propulsion system. Their armament remained the same as the earlier ships, but they received a new, longer-barreled 10.5 cm (4.1 in) SK L/45 gun instead of the shorter SK L/40 version of the gun. In addition, the new cruisers abandoned the pronounced ram bow that featured in all previous German light cruisers, and instead used a straight stem.

Augsburg underway

Augsburg was 130.50 meters (428 ft 2 in) long overall and had a beam of 14 m (45 ft 11 in) and a draft of 5.45 m (17 ft 11 in) forward. She displaced 4,362 metric tons (4,293 long tons) normally and up to 4,882 t (4,805 long tons) at full load. The ship had a forecastle deck that extended for the first third of the hull, which stepped down to main deck level for the central portion of the ship before stepping back up to a short sterncastle. She had a minimal superstructure that consisted of a small conning tower on the forecastle. The ship carried a pair of pole masts with platforms for searchlights, one directly aft of the conning tower, and the other closer to her stern. Augsburg had a crew of 18 officers and 349 enlisted men.

Her propulsion system consisted of two sets of Parsons steam turbines driving four 2.25-meter (7 ft 5 in) screw propellers. They were designed to give 19,000 metric horsepower (18,740 shp). Steam was provided by fifteen coal-fired Marine water-tube boilers, which were vented through three funnels placed amidships. These gave the ship a top speed of 25.5 knots (47.2 km/h; 29.3 mph). Augsburg carried 940 t (930 long tons; 1,040 short tons) of coal that gave her a range of approximately 3,500 nautical miles (6,500 km; 4,000 mi) at 14 knots (26 km/h; 16 mph).

The ship was armed with a main battery of twelve 10.5 cm (4.1 in) SK L/45 guns in single pedestal mounts. Two were placed side by side forward on the forecastle; eight were located on the broadside, four on either side; and two were side by side aft. These were replaced in 1916–1917 with six 15 cm (5.9 in) SK L/45 guns. She also carried four 5.2 cm (2 in) SK L/55 anti-aircraft guns, though these were replaced with a pair of two 8.8 cm (3.5 in) SK L/45 anti-aircraft guns in 1918. She was also equipped with a pair of 45 cm (17.7 in) torpedo tubes submerged in the hull. Two deck-mounted 50 cm (19.7 in) torpedo tube launchers were added in 1918. She could also carry 100 mines.

The ship was protected by an armor deck that was 20 to 40 mm (0.79 to 1.57 in) thick, and which curved downward at the sides to provide a measure of protection against enemy fire. Her conning tower had 100 mm (3.9 in) thick sides, and the main battery guns were fitted with gun shields that were 50 mm (2 in) thick.

== Service history ==
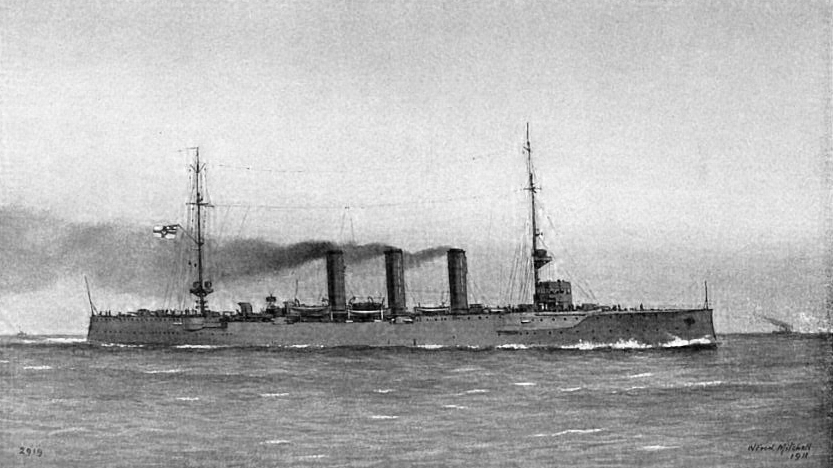
Illustration of Augsburg at sea

Augsburg was ordered as a replacement for the old unprotected cruiser SMS Sperber under the contract name Ersatz Sperber, (Note: German warships were ordered under provisional names. Additions to the fleet were given a single letter; ships intended to replace older or lost vessels were ordered as "Ersatz (name of the ship to be replaced)".) and was laid down on 22 August 1908 at the Kaiserliche Werft shipyard in Kiel. She was launched on 10 July 1909, and at the ceremony, Georg von Wolfram, the mayor of her namesake city, gave a speech. Fitting-out work then commenced. She was commissioned into the High Seas Fleet on 1 October 1910, initially under the command of Korvettenkapitän (KK—Corvette Captain) Ernst-Oldwig von Natzmer. She then embarked on sea trials that lasted into 1911; while still on her initial testing on 17 January, she took part in salvage operations for the sunken U-boat U-3 in Heikendorfer Bay. After completing her trials, on 24 February, Augsburg was assigned to the Torpedo Inspectorate for use as a torpedo training ship, a role that had been planned while she was still under construction. In March, Fregattenkapitän (FK—Frigate Captain) Johannes von Karpf replaced Natzmer as the ship's commander. She thereafter joined the Training and Test Ships Unit for training exercises in the central Baltic Sea that lasted from 2 to 29 April. In July, Augsburg conducted torpedo target practice in Norwegian waters. Later that month, she was part of the naval review held during the visit of the Austro-Hungarian Archduke Franz Ferdinand. During the German fleet's annual autumn training exercises in August and September, Augsburg was temporarily assigned to II Scouting Group.

The ship was then dry docked for periodic maintenance that lasted from 18 November to 5 January 1912. The first half of the year passed with routine training exercises; during this period, she operated with the Training and Test Ships Unit (which had been renamed the Training Squadron) from 31 March to 28 April. In July, the older cruiser Undine was decommissioned, and the ship's officers and crew were transferred to Augsburg. The latter vessel was then transferred from the Torpedo Inspectorate to the Naval Artillery Inspectorate to serve as a gunnery training ship, a role that Undine had previously filled. The ship was based at Sonderburg on the island of Alsen, and at that time, FK Victor Reclam took command of the ship. As in the previous year, during the 1912 autumn maneuvers, Augsburg operated with II Scouting Group. Another shipyard period at the Kaiserliche Werft (Imperial Shipyard) in Danzig followed from late September to early November. During this period, FK Andreas Fischer replaced Reclam.

The training routine for 1913 followed that of previous years. These activities were interrupted twice; the first was on 30 January. While moored in Sonderburg, Augsburg was driven to sea by severe storms and then ran aground south of the bridge that connected Alsen to the mainland. She remained there for about four hours before other ships were able to assist her crew in refloating the vessel. The second incident took place in late May, and also involved a grounding. This time, the large armored cruiser Blücher ran aground in the Great Belt off the island of Romsø. Augsburg was among the vessels that came to help free the ship, and these operations continued into early June. Augsburg was drydocked again in January 1914 for maintenance, and this work lasted until March. On 20 May 1914 she stopped in Dundee on a courtesy visit. Fischer and his crew were welcomed by the Lord Provost and "the greatest friendliness was displayed". The following month, Franz Ferdinand was assassinated in Sarajevo, which sparked the July Crisis and led to the outbreak of World War I in late July, starting with the Austro-Hungarian declaration of war on Serbia on the 28th. Augsburg and the bulk of the High Seas Fleet had been cruising in Norwegian waters during the crisis, but Kaiser Wilhelm II ordered the fleet home on 26 July as war appeared imminent, and he wanted to avoid a conflict with the British First Fleet.

=== World War I ===
==== 1914 ====
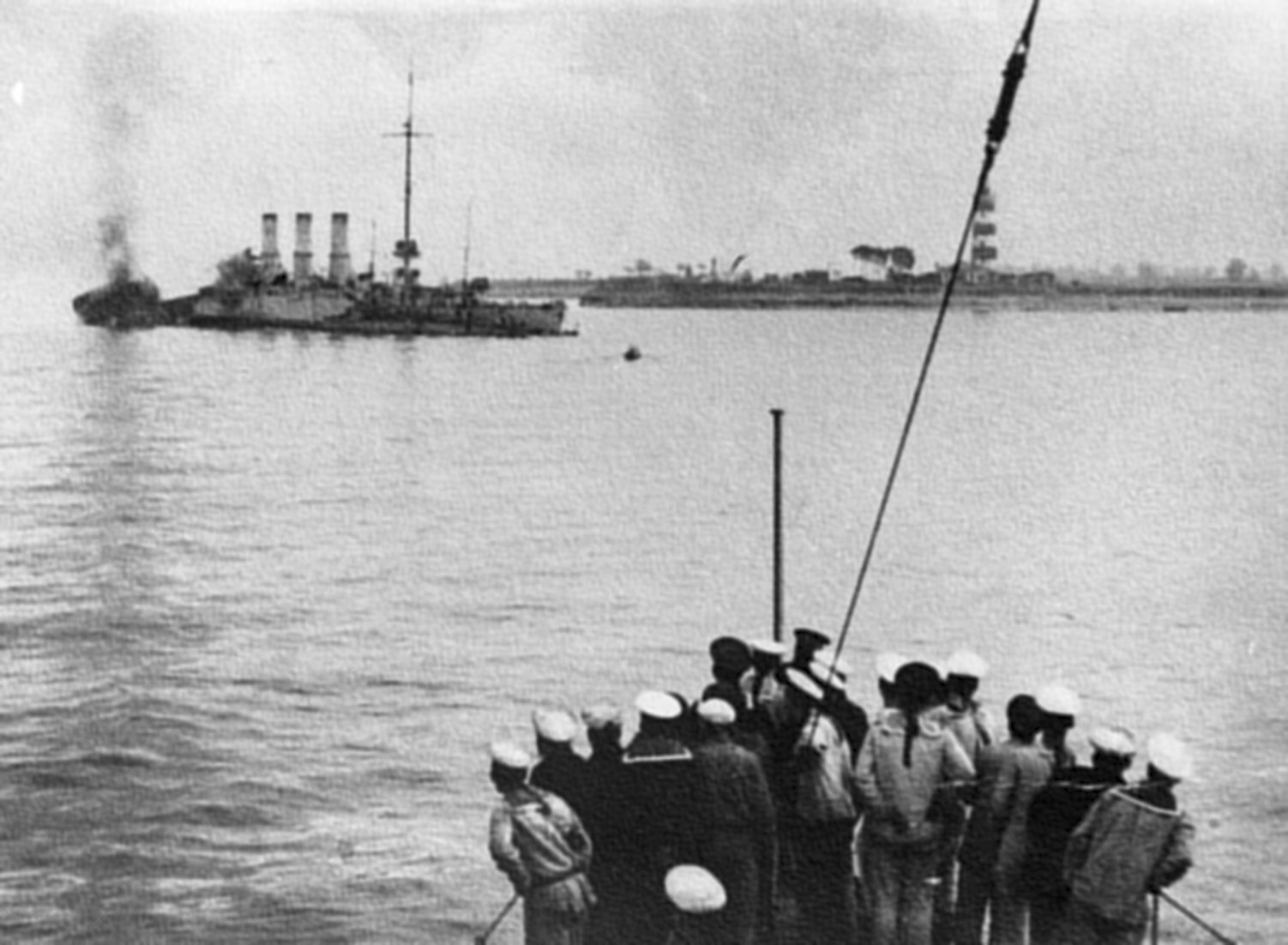
Magdeburg aground off Odensholm; she and Augsburg operated together during the first month of the war

Following the outbreak of World War I in August 1914, she was assigned to the Coastal Defense Division of the Baltic Sea, under the command of Rear Admiral Robert Mischke. The unit was tasked with defending the German coast primarily against Russian naval attacks, but the German naval command was also concerned with the possibility of British surface or submarine forces entering the Baltic via the Skagerrak. On 2 August, Augsburg and the light cruiser Magdeburg carried out a raid on the Russian harbor of Libau. The cruisers laid a minefield off the port and bombarded the city; during the operation, Augsburg fired the German fleet's first shells during the war. The Russians had in fact already left Libau, which was seized by the German Army. The minefield laid by Augsburg was poorly marked and hindered German operations more than Russian efforts. Augsburg and the rest of the Baltic light forces then conducted a series of bombardments of Russian positions.

Mischke transferred his flag to Augsburg on 7 August, and he commanded a series of raids into the eastern Baltic between 7 and 13 August and then 15 through 20 August. During the latter period, on 17 August, Augsburg, Magdeburg, three destroyers, and the minelayer Deutschland encountered a pair of powerful Russian armored cruisers, Admiral Makarov and Gromoboi. The Russian commander, under the mistaken assumption that the German armored cruisers Roon and Prinz Heinrich were present, did not attack and both forces withdrew. Shortly thereafter, the German naval command divided into eastern and western units. Konteradmiral (Rear Admiral) Ehler Behring took command of the eastern division, using the title "Detached Admiral". Behring made Augsburg his flagship on 23 August. That day, Augsburg embarked on a sortie into the eastern Baltic in company with Magdeburg, which resulted in the loss of the latter vessel three days later off the island of Odensholm. Augsburg returned to port two days later.

Over the course of September, Augsburg carried out a total of four sweeps into the central Baltic. The first began on the 1st; at around midnight on the night of 1–2 September, Augsburg came under attack by the Russian destroyer Novik, which launched torpedoes at the ship, though they missed. Later on the 2nd, Augsburg engaged the Russian cruisers Oleg and Bogatyr in a brief but inconclusive action. Also in early September, the light forces in the Baltic were reinforced with the IV Battle Squadron, composed of the older Braunschweig and Wittelsbach-class battleships, and Blücher. Starting on 3 September, the combined German force conducted a sweep into the Baltic. During the operation, Augsburg spotted the Russian cruisers Pallada and Bayan. She attempted to draw them closer to Blücher, but the Russians refused to take the bait and withdrew. On 7 September, Augsburg and the torpedo boat V25 steamed into the Gulf of Bothnia and sank the Russian steamer Uleåborg off Rauma. By the 9th, the German fleet had returned to port.

In October, KK Johannes Horn replaced Fischer as the ship's captain; he would command the ship for the bulk of her wartime service. That month, Augsburg took part in two operations in the Baltic that ended without encountering Russian forces. By this time, the armored cruiser Friedrich Carl had replaced Augsburg as Behring's flagship. On 17 November, Friedrich Carl struck mines off Memel and sank; Augsburg assisted in rescuing her crew, and she resumed her old role as Behring's flagship until 7 December, when she was replaced by the armored cruiser Prinz Adalbert. Augsburg took part in a further two sweeps into the Baltic, which also failed to locate any Russian vessels.

==== 1915 ====
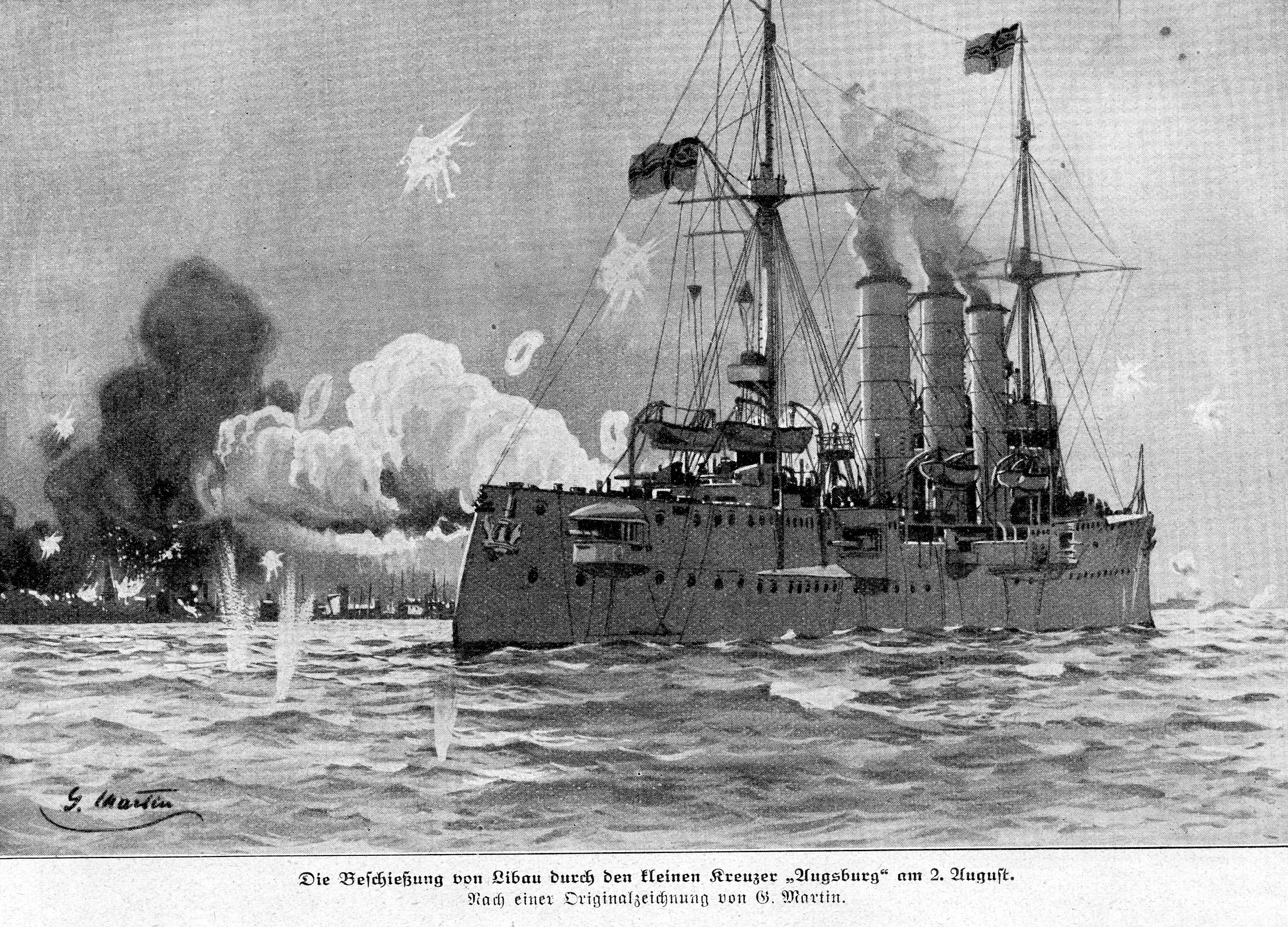
Illustration of Augsburg bombarding Libau

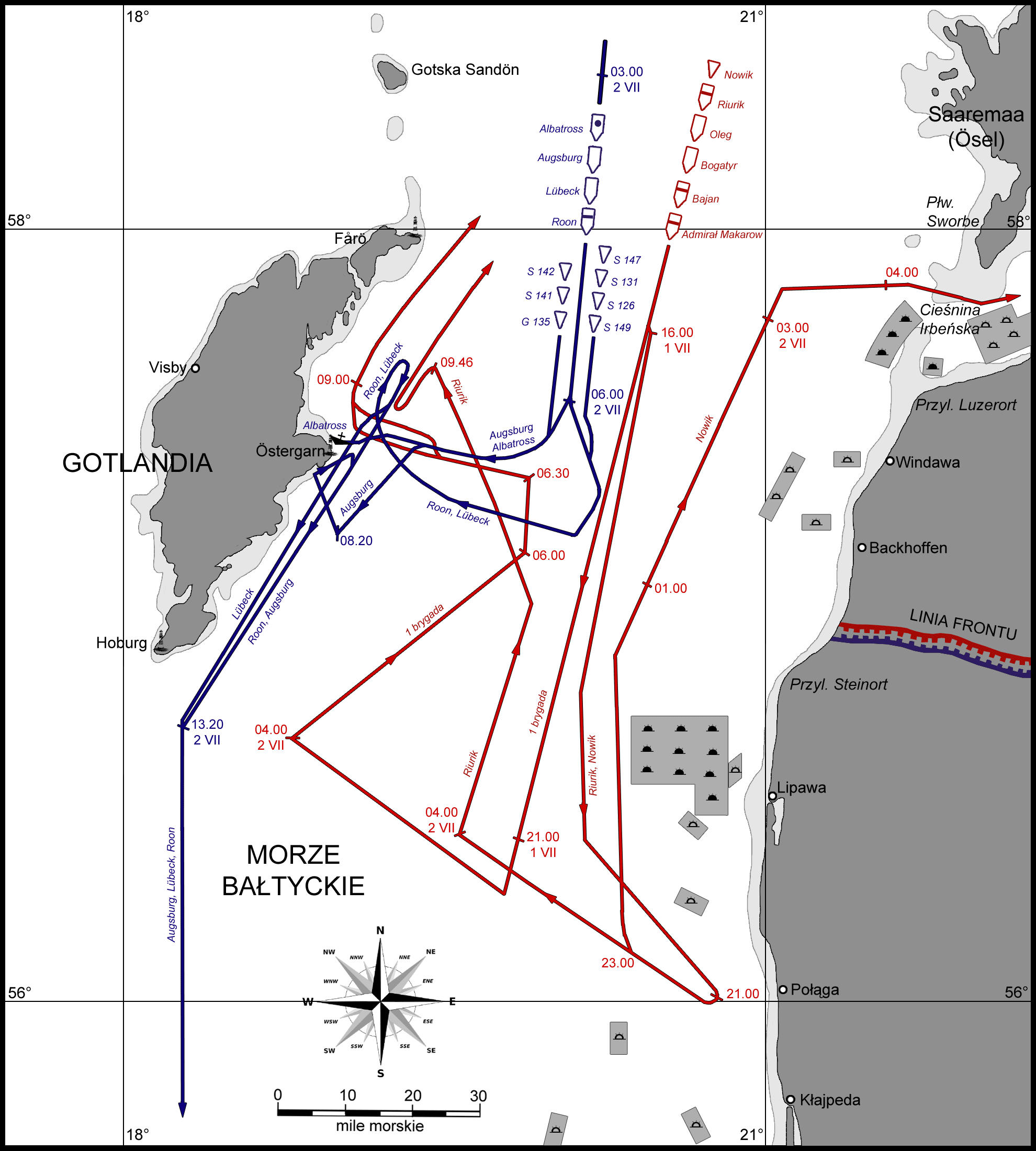
German (blue) and Russian (red) movements during the Battle of Åland Islands in July 1915

Augsburg participated in two offensive operations in January 1915. The first resulted in no combat, but the second saw the ship badly damaged. During the latter, at around midnight on the night of 24–25 January, Augsburg ran into a Russian minefield off Bornholm and struck a mine. The mine detonated near the third boiler room, killing eight men inside. The crew kept the ship afloat, and she was able to steam back to Stettin under her own power. There, the hole in her hull was patched, allowing her to then sail to the Blohm & Voss shipyard in Hamburg for permanent repairs. At the same time, a supplemental oil-firing system was installed for her boilers.

Augsburg was back in service by 21 April, ready for the next major operation in the eastern Baltic. Eight days later, Karpf returned to Augsburg to resume her service as his flagship. The German Army planned to seize Libau as a distraction from the main Austro-German effort at Gorlice–Tarnów. They requested naval support, and so the Navy organized a force comprising the coastal defense ship Beowulf, three armored cruisers, three light cruisers, including Augsburg, and a large number of torpedo boats and minesweepers. In addition, IV Scouting Group, consisting of four light cruisers and twenty-one torpedo boats, was sent from the North Sea to reinforce the operation. Augsburg participated in a preparatory bombardment of the city on 7 May. The German Army captured Libau soon thereafter, and it was subsequently turned into an advance base for the German Navy. Later that month, Augsburg took part in several minelaying operations in the Gulf of Finland. During one of these sorties, Augsburg and Lübeck were to lay a minefield near the entrance to the Gulf of Finland, but a submarine attack on the cruiser Thetis, prompted the German naval command to cancel the operation.

On 28 June, Augsburg bombarded Windau (Ventspils). During that operation, the Russian Kasatka-class submarine Okun fired two torpedoes at Augsburg on the night of 28 June, though both missed. On 1 July, Augsburg, Roon, Lübeck, and seven torpedo boats escorted the minelaying cruiser SMS Albatross while she laid a field off Bogskär. Augsburg served as the flagship Karpf, the commander of the operation. After finishing laying the minefield, Karpf sent a wireless transmission informing headquarters he had accomplished the mission, and was returning to port. This message was intercepted by the Russians, allowing them to intercept the Germans. Four Russian armored cruisers, with the powerful armored cruiser Rurik steaming in support, attempted to ambush the German squadron. Karpf dispersed his force shortly before encountering the Russians; Augsburg, Albatross, and three torpedo boats steamed to Rixhöft while the remainder went to Libau. Shortly after 06:30 on 2 July, lookouts on Augsburg spotted the Russian force; Karpf ordered the slower Albatross to seek refuge in neutral Swedish waters, while Augsburg and the torpedo boats used their high speed to escape the Russians. In the engagement that followed, Albatross was badly damaged and ran aground in Swedish waters. The Russians then turned to engage the second German force, but were low on ammunition after the engagement with Augsburg and Albatross and broke off the engagement.

Augsburg was assigned to the forces that took part in the Battle of the Gulf of Riga in August 1915. A significant detachment from the High Seas Fleet, including eight dreadnoughts and three battlecruisers, went into the Baltic to clear the Gulf of Riga of Russian naval forces. Augsburg participated in the second attack on 16 August, led by the dreadnoughts Nassau and Posen. On the night of 19 August, Augsburg encountered a pair of Russian gunboats—Sivutch and Korietz; Augsburg and Posen sank Sivutch, though Korietz managed to escape. The Russian surface forces had by this time withdrawn to Moon Sound, and the threat of Russian submarines and mines still in the Gulf prompted the Germans to retreat. Augsburg was only lightly damaged by Russian artillery fire during the fighting in the Gulf of Riga. She thereafter resumed sweeps into the eastern Baltic, which occupied the cruiser's crew for the rest of 1915. On 13 October, an unknown submarine fired a torpedo at Augsburg, though it did not hit her.

==== 1916–1918 ====
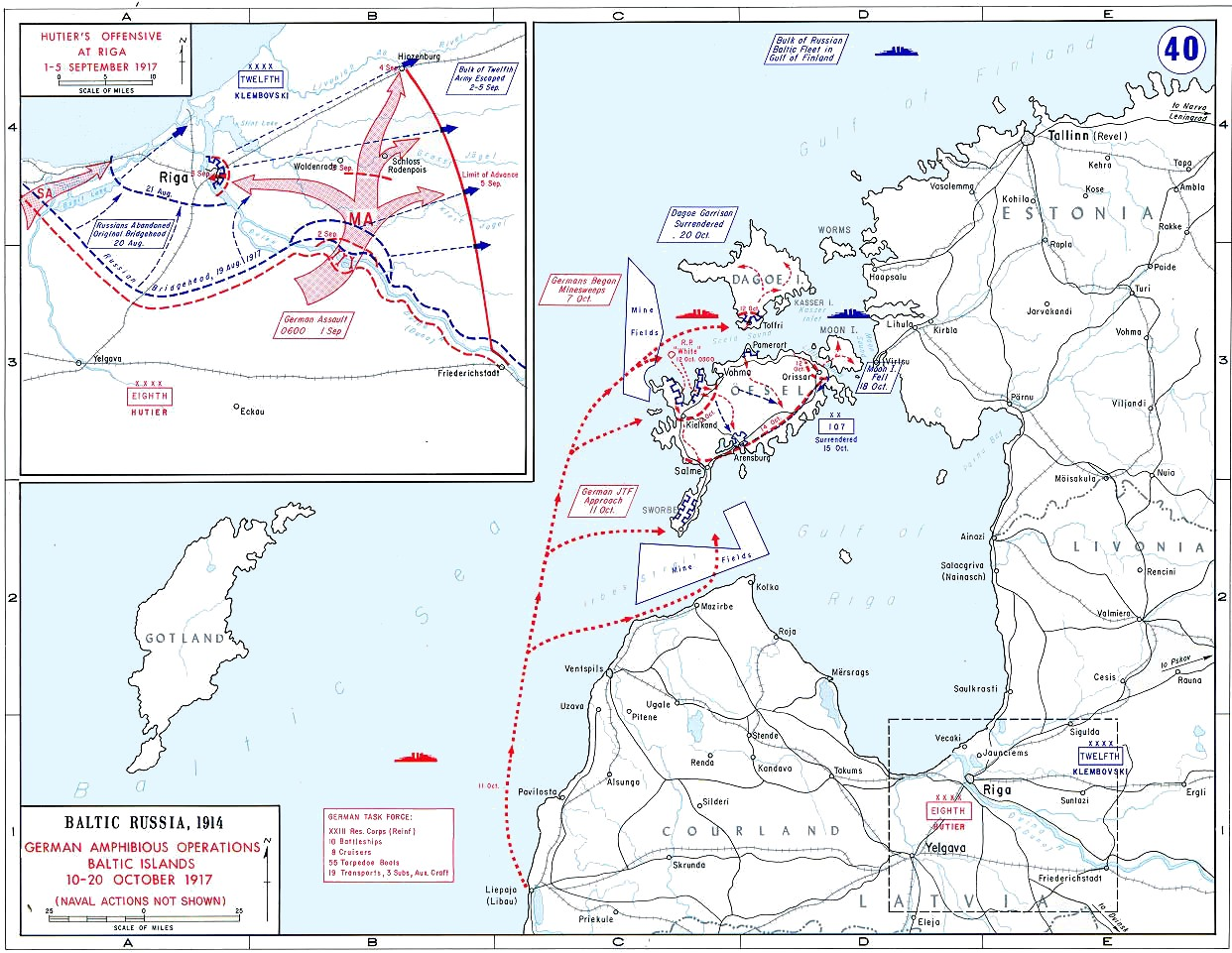
Map of German movements during Operation Albion

The German scouting forces in the Baltic were reorganized in January 1916. Augsburg was assigned to the newly created VI Scouting Group, which was led by the light cruiser Kolberg. By this time, the naval war in the Baltic had devolved into a positional conflict, as both sides attempted to defend their bases with minefields and block their enemies in with offensive minefields. As such, Augsburg participated in numerous patrols and minelaying operations over the course of the year. In April and May alone, Augsburg, the cruiser Strassburg, and the auxiliary minelayers Deutschland and Rügen laid a total of 3485 mines. Augsburg participated in an experimental air raid on the port of Reval (Tallinn) in July; she and several other ships each embarked a single aircraft for the attack, which was carried out successfully. By August, Augsburg and several other light craft were moved forward to Windau, which had by then been occupied by the German army.

In September, Augsburg participated in an attempt to force the Irben Strait into the Gulf of Riga. Heavy Russian resistance, primarily from the old battleship Slava, forced the Germans to retreat from the Gulf. During the operation, Augsburg was lightly grounded and damaged her double bottom, though she was able to withdraw. The ship had to return to the Kaiserliche Werft in Kiel for repairs; the period at the shipyard was also used to rearm the ship with six 16 cm guns in place of her twelve 10.5 cm weapons. Her conning tower was also rebuilt at this time. Work on the ship continued into early 1917, and by April she was once again ready for operations in the Baltic. During the shipyard period, in January 1917, Horn was replaced by KK Westerkamp. The latter served aboard the ship for just six months, being replaced in July by FK Lutter.

In October and November 1917, Augsburg participated in another attack on the Gulf of Riga, Operation Albion. By this point, she had been assigned to the VI Scouting Group along with Strassburg and Kolberg. At 06:00 on 14 October 1917, the three ships left Libau to escort minesweeping operations in the Gulf of Riga. They were attacked by Russian 12-inch (305 mm) coastal guns on their approach and were temporarily forced to turn away. By 08:45, however, they had anchored off the Mikailovsk Bank and the minesweepers began to clear a path in the minefields. Two days later, Augsburg joined the dreadnoughts König and Kronprinz for a sweep of the Gulf of Riga. While the battleships engaged the Russian naval forces, Augsburg was tasked with supervising the occupation of Arensburg.

The Armistice between Russia and the Central Powers went into effect in December 1917, which ended the fighting on the Eastern Front, which allowed Germany to withdraw its naval forces from the eastern Baltic. Accordingly, Augsburg left Windau on 10 January 1918 and returned home. She was assigned to the U-boat school and used for the next several months to assist with training new U-boat crews. This service lasted through June, and on 20 July, she was transferred to the High Seas Fleet to replace the cruiser Stettin as the flagship of the minesweeping force. These ships were tasked with clearing channels in the minefields that surrounded German ports, to ensure safe access by the fleet and its U-boats. The minesweeping force was based at Cuxhaven, and was commanded by Kapitän zur See (Captain at Sea) Karl August Nerger, who flew his flag aboard Augsburg. In September, KK Bernhard Bobsien took command of the ship; he was to be her final captain.

==== End of the War ====
Augsburg was at Cuxhaven when the war ended by the Armistice of 11 November 1918. The terms of the Armistice required the bulk of the High Seas Fleet to be interned at Scapa Flow for the duration of negotiations for the final peace treaty, but Augsburg was not included in the list of ships. She was instead decommissioned at Cuxhaven on 17 December. According to the Armistice, Augsburg and the rest of the German fleet not interned in Scapa Flow were to be returned to the main German ports and disarmed. In the subsequent Treaty of Versailles that formally ended the conflict, Augsburg was listed as a warship to be surrendered to the Allied powers; she was to be disarmed in accordance with the terms of the Armistice, but her guns were to remain on board. On 28 August 1920, Augsburg left Germany along with Lübeck and eleven torpedo boats to be surrendered to the Allies. They arrived in Rosyth, Great Britain, on 2 September. Augsburg was surrendered to Japan as a war prize on 3 September, under the name "Y". The Japanese had no use for the ship, and so she was broken up in Dordrecht in 1922.
