= SMS Kolberg =

Light cruiser of the German Imperial Navy

- In French service as Colmar during her deployment to China in 1924

History

German Empire
- Name: SMS Kolberg
- Namesake: Kolberg
- Laid down: 1908
- Launched: 14 November 1908
- Completed: 21 June 1910
- Decommissioned: 17 December 1918
- Stricken: 5 November 1919

History

France
- Acquired: 28 April 1920
- Commissioned: 1922
- Decommissioned: November 1925
- Renamed: Colmar
- Fate: Scrapped, 1929

General characteristics
- Class & type: Kolberg-class cruiser
- Displacement: Normal: 4,362 metric tons (4,293 long tons); Full load: 4,915 t (4,837 long tons)
- Length: 130.50 m (428 ft 2 in)
- Beam: 14 m (45 ft 11 in)
- Draft: 5.38–5.58 m (17 ft 8 in – 18 ft 4 in)
- Installed power: 19,000 shp (14,000 kW); 15 × boilers
- Propulsion: 4 × screw propellers; 4 × steam turbines
- Speed: 25.5 knots (47.2 km/h; 29.3 mph)
- Range: 3,250 nmi (6,020 km; 3,740 mi) at 14 knots (26 km/h; 16 mph)
- Complement: 367
- Armament: 12 × 1 - 10.5 cm (4.1 in) SK L/45 guns; 2 × 45 cm (17.7 in) torpedo tubes
- Armor: Deck: 20–40 mm (0.79–1.57 in); Gun shields: 50 mm (2 in); Conning tower: 100 mm (3.9 in)

SMS Kolberg (Note: "SMS" stands for "Seiner Majestät Schiff" (German: His Majesty's Ship).) was a light cruiser of the German Kaiserliche Marine (Imperial Navy) during the First World War, the lead ship of her class. She had three sister ships, SMS Mainz, Cöln, and Augsburg. She was built by the Schichau-Werke; her hull was laid down in early 1908 and she was launched later that year, in November. She was commissioned into the High Seas Fleet in June 1910. She was armed with a main battery of twelve 10.5 cm SK L/45 guns and had a top speed of 25.5 kn (47.2 km/h; 29.3 mph).

Kolberg saw action in several engagements with the British during the war, including the raid on Scarborough, Hartlepool and Whitby in December 1914 and the Battle of Dogger Bank the following month. She also saw action against the Russians on two occasions, during the Battle of the Gulf of Riga in August 1915 and Operation Albion in November 1917. After the end of the war, she was ceded to France as a war prize and renamed Colmar. She served only briefly in the French Navy, including a deployment to Asia in 1924. She was stricken in 1927 and broken up two years later.

== Design ==
The Kolberg class of light cruisers were a development of the preceding Dresden class. The primary objective during their design process was to increase speed over the earlier vessels; this required a longer hull to fit an expanded propulsion system. Their armament remained the same as the earlier ships, but they received a new, longer-barreled 10.5 cm (4.1 in) SK L/45 gun instead of the shorter SK L/40 version of the gun. In addition, the new cruisers abandoned the pronounced ram bow that featured in all previous German light cruisers, and instead used a straight stem.

Plan and profile drawing of the Kolberg class

Kolberg was 130.50 meters (428 ft 2 in) long overall and had a beam of 14 m (45 ft 11 in) and a draft of 5.58 m (18 ft 4 in) forward. She displaced 4,362 metric tons (4,293 long tons) normally and up to 4,915 t (4,837 long tons; 5,418 short tons) at full load. The ship had a forecastle deck that extended for the first third of the hull, which stepped down to main deck level for the central portion of the ship before stepping back up to a short sterncastle. She had a minimal superstructure that consisted of a small conning tower on the forecastle. The ship carried a pair of pole masts with platforms for searchlights, one directly aft of the conning tower, and the other closer to her stern. Kolberg had a crew of eighteen officers and 349 enlisted men.

Her propulsion system consisted of two sets of Melms & Pfenniger steam turbines driving four 2.25-meter (7 ft 5 in) screw propellers. They were designed to give 19,000 metric horsepower (13,974 kW; 18,740 shp). Steam was provided by fifteen coal-fired Marine water-tube boilers, which were vented through three funnels placed amidships. These gave the ship a top speed of 25.5 knots (47.2 km/h; 29.3 mph). Kolberg carried 970 t (950 long tons; 1,070 short tons) of coal that gave her a range of approximately 3,250 nautical miles (6,020 km; 3,740 mi) at 14 knots (26 km/h; 16 mph).

The ship was armed with a main battery of twelve 10.5 cm SK L/45 guns in single pedestal mounts. Two were placed side by side forward on the forecastle; eight were located on the broadside; four on either side, and two were side by side aft. These were replaced in 1916–1917 with six 15 cm SK L/45 guns. She also carried four 5.2 cm (2 in) SK L/55 anti-aircraft guns, though these were replaced with a pair of two 8.8 cm (3.5 in) SK L/45 anti-aircraft guns in 1918. She was also equipped with a pair of 45 cm (17.7 in) torpedo tubes submerged in the hull. Two deck-mounted 50 cm (19.7 in) torpedo tube launchers were added in 1918. She could also carry 100 mines.

The ship was protected by an armor deck that was 20 to 40 mm (0.79 to 1.57 in) thick, and which curved downward at the sides to provide a measure of protection against enemy fire. Her conning tower had 100 mm (3.9 in) thick sides, and the main battery guns were fitted with gun shields that were 50 mm (2 in) thick.

== Service history ==
=== Pre-war career ===
Kolberg was ordered under the contract name Ersatz Greif, (Note: German warships were ordered under provisional names. Additions to the fleet were given a single letter; ships intended to replace older or lost vessels were ordered as "Ersatz (name of the ship to be replaced)".) and the contract for her construction was awarded to the Schichau-Werke shipyard in Danzig on 24 August 1907. (Note: German warships were ordered under provisional names. For new additions to the fleet, they were given a single letter; for those ships intended to replace older or lost vessels, they were ordered as "Ersatz (name of the ship to be replaced)".) Her keel was laid down on 15 January 1908; work proceeded quickly and she was launched on 14 November. At the launching ceremony, Oberbürgermeister (Lord Mayor) of Kolberg Dr. Schmieder christened the ship after his city. Fitting-out work took another twenty months and she conducted builder's trials in early 1910. She was commissioned on 21 June 1910 for full sea trials, though these were delayed twice by crew shortages. During trials she visited her namesake city on 30 April and again from 5 to 8 June 1911. On 13 June, Kolberg was finally pronounced ready for service; the following day, her first active duty commander Fregattenkapitän (Frigate Captain) Paul Heinrich came aboard the ship.

On 15 June, Kolberg steamed from Danzig to Kiel, where she joined the reconnaissance forces of the High Seas Fleet, taking the place of the light cruiser Königsberg. She thereafter was ordered to accompany Kaiser Wilhelm's yacht Hohenzollern II to a sailing regatta held in the mouth of the Elbe and then for a visit to Bergen and Balestrand, Norway. She arrived back in Kiel on 2 August and five days later joined the rest of the fleet scouts in the Kattegat for annual fleet training. After the conclusion of the exercises in September, Kolberg took part in a naval review held off Swinemünde during a visit of the Austro-Hungarian crown prince, Archduke Franz Ferdinand. Kolberg thereafter underwent periodic maintenance, which prevented her from joining the rest of the reconnaissance force on a cruise to Norway.

Kolberg began the year 1912 with training exercises in the North Sea in February. In March, she was again assigned to escort Hohenzollern for a cruise abroad; the two ships left Kiel on 5 March and steamed south through the Atlantic Ocean to the Mediterranean Sea. They stopped in Gibraltar from 11 to 12 March before proceeding on to Venice, Italy on 17 March. The ships then began a tour of Mediterranean ports that lasted from 26 March to 10 May. During this period, Kolberg steamed from the island of Corfu to Brindisi, Italy on 11 April, where she embarked the German Chancellor Theobald von Bethmann Hollweg to carry him to Corfu and then later back to Brindisi. Kolberg was in Genoa, Italy when she was recalled to Germany on 12 May. She stopped in Vigo, Spain on 16–17 May and arrived off Helgoland on 23 May, where she rejoined the High Seas Fleet. From 23 June to 9 July, she temporarily served as the flagship of I Scouting Group while the battlecruiser Von der Tann was under repair and the new battlecruiser Moltke had not yet entered service. The rest of the year was occupied with peacetime training exercises and routine cruises in the North and Baltic Seas. The same pattern followed in 1913 and the first half of 1914; Kolberg's service during this period was uneventful, apart from another period escorting Wilhelm II, who this time cruised aboard the HAPAG steamship Vaterland, on a tour of Norwegian ports in July 1913.

=== World War I ===
==== North Sea operations ====
Following the outbreak of World War I in July 1914, Kolberg and the rest of II Scouting Group were tasked with patrolling the German North Sea coast and supporting the torpedo-boat screen that kept watch for hostile sea forces. On 17–18 August, Kolberg and the light cruisers Strassburg and Stralsund went on a patrol out to the Broad Fourteens but encountered no British vessels. Kolberg was stationed in the mouth of the Ems river on the morning of 28 August, when the sound of distant gunfire alerted the crew to the Battle of Helgoland Bight, then underway. She, Stralsund, and the light cruiser Danzig immediately sortied to reinforce the German vessels in the bight, but they arrived too late to see action with the British cruisers. Kolberg reached the burning cruiser Ariadne and took off her surviving crew before the latter vessel sank. Kolberg was erroneously said to have been sunk in the battle in initial reports. On 9 September, Kolberg escorted the minelaying cruisers Albatross and Nautilus and the auxiliary minelayer Kaiser while they laid the defensive minefield "Alpha" on the western side of the German Bight. She escorted Nautilus again on 16–18 October to lay an offensive minefield off the Firth of Forth, but the presence of British warships in the Dogger Bank forced the Germans to break off the operation.

Beginning in November, the German fleet began a series of raids on coastal British towns in the hopes of provoking part of the British Grand Fleet to sortie, which could then be cut off and destroyed by the High Seas Fleet. Kolberg participated in the first of these, the raid on Yarmouth on 2–4 November, where she supported the battlecruisers of I Scouting Group that were commanded by Konteradmiral (Rear Admiral) Franz von Hipper. During the operation, she covered Stralsund, which had been fitted to carry a load of naval mines that were laid off the British coast. During the subsequent raid on Scarborough, Hartlepool and Whitby on 15–16 December, Kolberg was also modified to carry 100 mines, which she laid off Filey Brigg while the battlecruisers shelled the ports. (Note: This minefield would claim several merchant ships over the coming days, along with the Royal Navy trawler HMT Night Hawk.) When the German forces withdrew, the weather became bad enough that Hipper ordered the other light cruisers to steam independently to the rendezvous with the main fleet; Kolberg had meanwhile joined up with the battlecruisers and proceeded with them. The heavy weather caused some damage to the ship, and so Kolberg had to be repaired from 16 December to 6 January 1915.

A little over a month later, she saw action at the Battle of Dogger Bank, on 24 January 1915. The engagement began when Kolberg encountered the British cruiser HMS Aurora at about 08:10; both ships opened fire, drawing the British and German battlecruiser squadrons to the action. In the span of about fifteen minutes, Kolberg quickly scored three hits on Aurora, which replied with two hits of her own. One of the shells struck Kolberg below the waterline and the other shell hit the ship above the waterline; the hits killed two men and wounded two others. On 26 January, Kapitän zur See (KzS—Captain at Sea) Karl von Restorff, the II. Führer der Torpedoboote (Leader of Torpedo Boats), raised his flag aboard Kolberg, making her his flagship. For the rest of 1915, she continued in her role with the fleet, participating in the sorties conducted by Admiral Hugo von Pohl and patrolling the German Bight.

In August 1915, she and significant portions of the fleet were transferred to the Baltic for the Battle of the Gulf of Riga. Kolberg was part of the covering force for the I Scouting Group battlecruisers, she was assigned to serve as a flotilla leader for three and a half flotillas of torpedo boats, as part of an assault force into the Gulf of Riga. On 10 August she was tasked with bombarding Russian coastal batteries on the island of Utö and the harbor of Hanko in southern Finland. While shelling the positions, Russian destroyers sortied to intercept Kolberg, and the ensuing battle prompted Hipper to send Von der Tann to support her. Numerous reports of submarines in the area convinced the Germans to withdraw. A few days later, on the night of 13–14 August, Kolberg was present off the Irbe Strait at the southern entrance to the Gulf of Riga when she was attacked by Russian destroyers and coastal guns. On either 15 or 16 August 1915, a Russian submarine fired a single torpedo at Kolberg which missed. On 21 August, she returned to the North Sea, where she resumed patrol duties. Kolberg participated in the fleet operation on 11–12 September to cover a group of minelayers off the Swarte Bank, but she was in dock for maintenance during the sortie of 23–24 October, prompting Restorff to temporarily transfer to the cruiser Graudenz. On 12 November, KzS Max Köthner replaced Restorff.

==== Baltic Sea operations ====
In January 1916, Kolberg was transferred to the Baltic Sea naval forces. She was occupied with training exercises in February, and on 27 February she steamed to Libau, where she replaced the cruiser Elbing as the flagship of VI Scouting Group, which had been formed only on 15 January 1916. Kommodore (Commodore) Hugo Langemak raised his flag aboard the ship, though she served as his flagship only briefly, before being replaced by Strassburg on 12 September. By 1916, the naval war in the Baltic had become a stalemate, with neither side's fleet willing to engage the other, instead preferring to use minefields. As a result, Kolberg was primarily occupied with patrolling the Baltic and supporting minelayers. She operated primarily with Strassburg, the cruiser Augsburg, the torpedo boat V100, and VIII and X Torpedo Boat Flotillas. From 12 to 15 September, now-KAdm Langemak attempted to force his way into the Gulf of Riga to destroy the Russian pre-dreadnought battleship Slava, but the Germans failed to break into the gulf.

Kolberg was thereafter transferred to Windau and Langemak shifted his flag to Augsburg. On 11 November, Kolberg returned to Libau, and a month later, she went to Kiel on 12 December to be modernized at the Kaiserliche Werft (Imperial Shipyard) there. The work lasted from 16 December to 11 May 1917, and included a reconstruction of her bridge that significantly changed her silhouette, the installation of two 50 cm torpedo tubes in deck launchers, and the replacement of her original battery with 15 cm guns. She left Kiel on 7 June to return to her unit, arriving in Libau four days later. Langemak briefly returned to Kolberg from 18 to 23 July before transferring back to Augsburg.

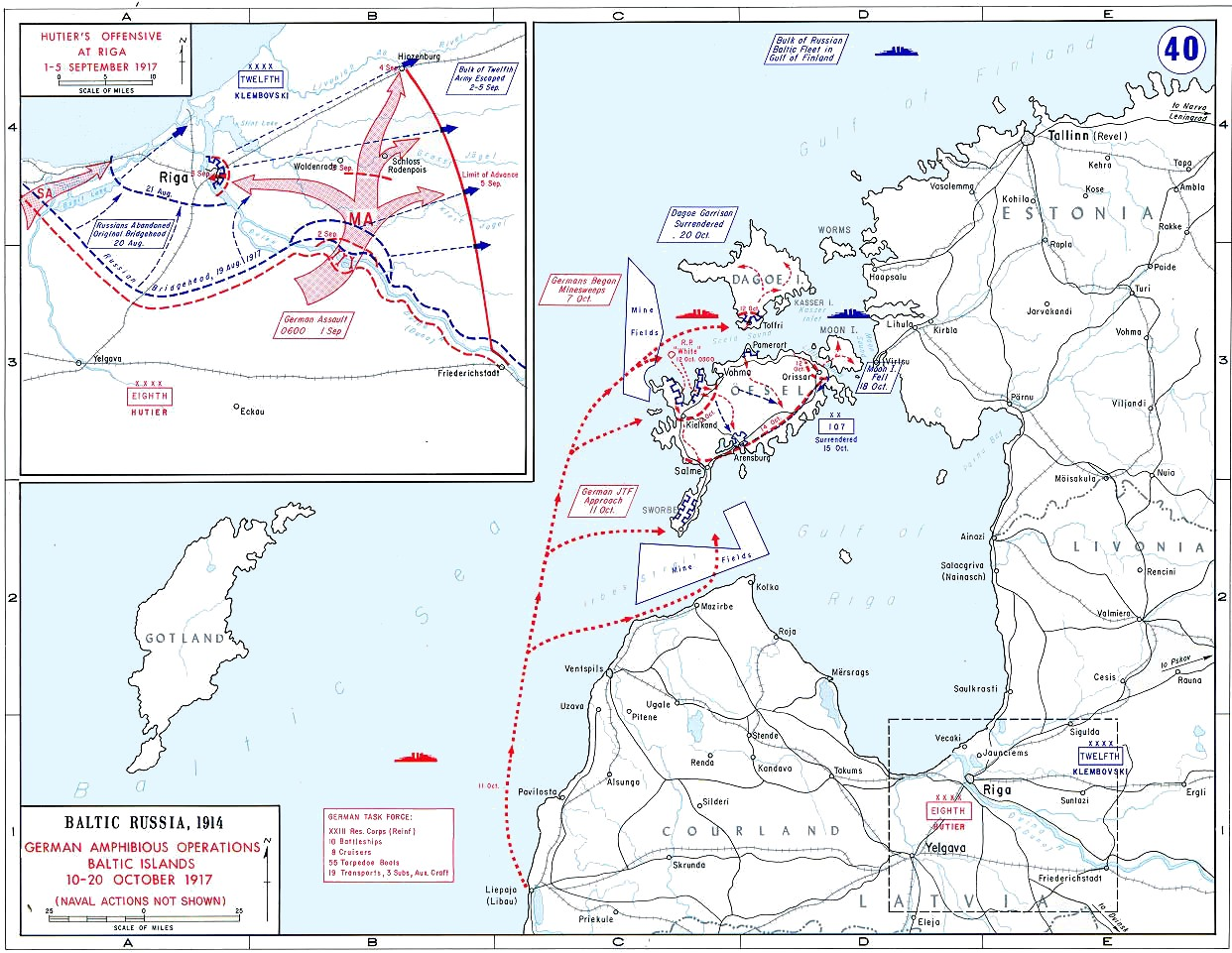
Map of German movements during Operation Albion

Most of 1917 passed uneventfully for Kolberg until significant elements of the High Seas Fleet were transferred to the Baltic for Operation Albion, the conquest of the Gulf of Riga after the German Army captured the city during the Battle of Riga the month before. During the operation, Vizeadmiral (VAdm—Vice Admiral) Albert Hopman—who had replaced Langemak in December 1916—used Kolberg as his flagship. At 06:00 on 14 October, Kolberg, Strassburg, Augsburg, and the old aviso Blitz, with escorting torpedo boats and minesweepers, sortied from Libau. The ships broke through the Irbe Strait and began minesweeping operations in the Gulf of Riga. They were attacked by Russian 12-inch (300 mm) coastal guns on their approach and were temporarily forced to turn away. By 08:45, however, they had anchored off the Mikailovsk Bank and the minesweepers began to clear a path in the minefields.

Two days later, Strassburg and Kolberg joined the dreadnoughts König and Kronprinz for a sweep of the Gulf of Riga. In the ensuing Battle of Moon Sound, the battleships destroyed Slava and forced the pre-dreadnought Grazhdanin to leave the Gulf. Later that day, Kolberg moved into the Gulf and engaged a Russian coastal battery at Woi on Moon Island for ten minutes, starting at 13:35. The Russian guns did not return fire, so Kolberg ceased firing, and at 14:25, anchored in the Kleinen Sound with Strassburg. A landing party of forty men was assembled to capture the Russian guns at Woi; they landed on the island at 15:45 and by 17:30, the landing party had captured the guns and rendered them inoperable. On 4 November, Kolberg steamed from Arensburg to Windau, where she embarked Prince Leopold of Bavaria, the Ober Ost, the supreme commander of German forces on the Eastern Front. She carried Leopold back to Arensburg before returning him to Windau on 11 November. From there, Kolberg steamed to Libau to reembark Hopman.

KAdm Ludolf von Uslar replaced Hopman on 7 December; Uslar raised his flag aboard Kolberg that day, but he remained aboard only for a short time before she was recalled to Kiel for an overhaul; she left Libau on 29 December, and the shipyard work lasted from 1 January to 17 March 1918. During this period, she had a pair of 8.8 cm Flak guns installed. The Russian government had agreed to an armistice with the Central Powers in December 1917, and while Kolberg was in the shipyard, the Baltic Sea reconnaissance force was dissolved on 24 January. A new command, the Befehlshaber der Sicherung der Ostsee (BSO—Commander of the Defense of the Baltic Sea) was created, with separate western and eastern divisions. On returning to service, Kolberg became the flagship of the western division of the BSO, KAdm Hermann Nordmann, though he was replaced by KAdm Walter von Keyserlink on 28 October.

Kolberg was transferred to the "Sonderverband für die Ostsee" (Special Unit for the Baltic Sea) on 28 March, which was tasked with supporting the German intervention in the Finnish Civil War. Kolberg took part in the attack on Hanko by the 14th Jäger Battalion. She later replaced the battleship Rheinland, which had been stationed in Åland to support German forces there. She remained there until 19 May, when she was replaced by Stralsund; Kolberg left Mariehamn in Åland the following day, bound for Kiel. She arrived there on 22 May and was returned to the BSO. The ship briefly patrolled the Little Belt before returning to the Baltic on 18 June, resuming her role as Uslar's flagship. Uslar's command had by that time been renamed the Befehlshaber der Baltischer Gewässer (BBG—Commander of Baltic Waters). She carried the Chief of the Marinestation der Ostsee (Baltic Sea Naval Station), Admiral Gustav Bachmann on a tour of Danzig, Libau, Windau, Reval, and Arensburg before disembarking him in Riga.

From 3 to 23 July, Kolberg went to Kiel before returning to Libau. She went on a tour of the Baltic, stopping in Reval, Helsinki, Kotka, Hungerburg, Björkösund, and Hanko. The ship was assigned to IV Scouting Group under VAdm Friedrich Boedicker for Operation Schlußstein, a planned amphibious attack on the Russian capital at St. Petersburg, but the operation was called off on 5 September. Kolberg was then transferred back to the BBG and assigned as the station ship for Helsinki. On the way there, she stopped in Mariehamn, Jakobstad, and Nikolaistad (Vaasa). On 25 September, the ship went to Reval, where she received orders to return to Kiel, where she was to be decommissioned. She left the city two days later and arrived in Kiel on 29 September. Between 2 and 5 October, parts of her crew were transferred to the Naval Detachment in Crimea. Kolberg was decommissioned on 17 December, after the end of the war; she was not included in the list of ships to be interned at Scapa Flow, and so she remained behind in Kiel.

=== Service with the French Navy ===
Colmar in Shanghai, c. 1924

Kolberg was listed as one of the vessels to be surrendered to the Allied powers under the terms of the Treaty of Versailles. The ship was accordingly stricken from the naval register on 5 November 1919, and on 21 April, she left Germany in company with six torpedo boats. They arrived in Cherbourg, France, four days later; Kolberg was the first ex-German cruiser to arrive there. On 28 April 1920, Kolberg was formally transferred to the French Navy under the name "W". She was commissioned in the French fleet as Colmar in 1922. She was not significantly modified in French service, the primary change being the replacement of her 8.8 cm guns with 75 mm (3 in) anti-aircraft guns. Colmar also had a new aft deckhouse built and the 75 mm guns were installed on its roof. After the work was completed, she underwent sea trials for almost a year.

In 1922, she was assigned to a colonial tour in French Indochina that lasted for three years. She left France on 19 June 1922 and arrived in the colony on 7 September. On arrival, she replaced the armored cruiser Montcalm as the flagship of the Division Navale de l'Extreme Orient (Naval Division of the Far East). She was in Vladivostok, Russia in 1923 when the Great Kantō earthquake hit Japan, so she steamed to Yokohama to assist in the relief effort.

Several other cruisers joined her during her deployment, including the armored cruisers Jules Michelet, Victor Hugo, and Jules Ferry. In September 1924, Colmar and Jules Ferry contributed to a multi-national landing party of around 1,800 men drawn together due to violence in Shanghai. Colmar was recalled to France in November, and she arrived back in France on 11 February 1925. She remained in French service for only a few months, being deemed unfit for further service in November, when she was decommissioned. Over the course of 1926 and 1927, she was cannibalized for parts for the other ex-German cruisers in French service, and she was stricken on 21 July 1927. Ultimately, she was broken up for scrap two years later in Brest, France.
