= Leberecht Maass =

German admiral (1863–1914)

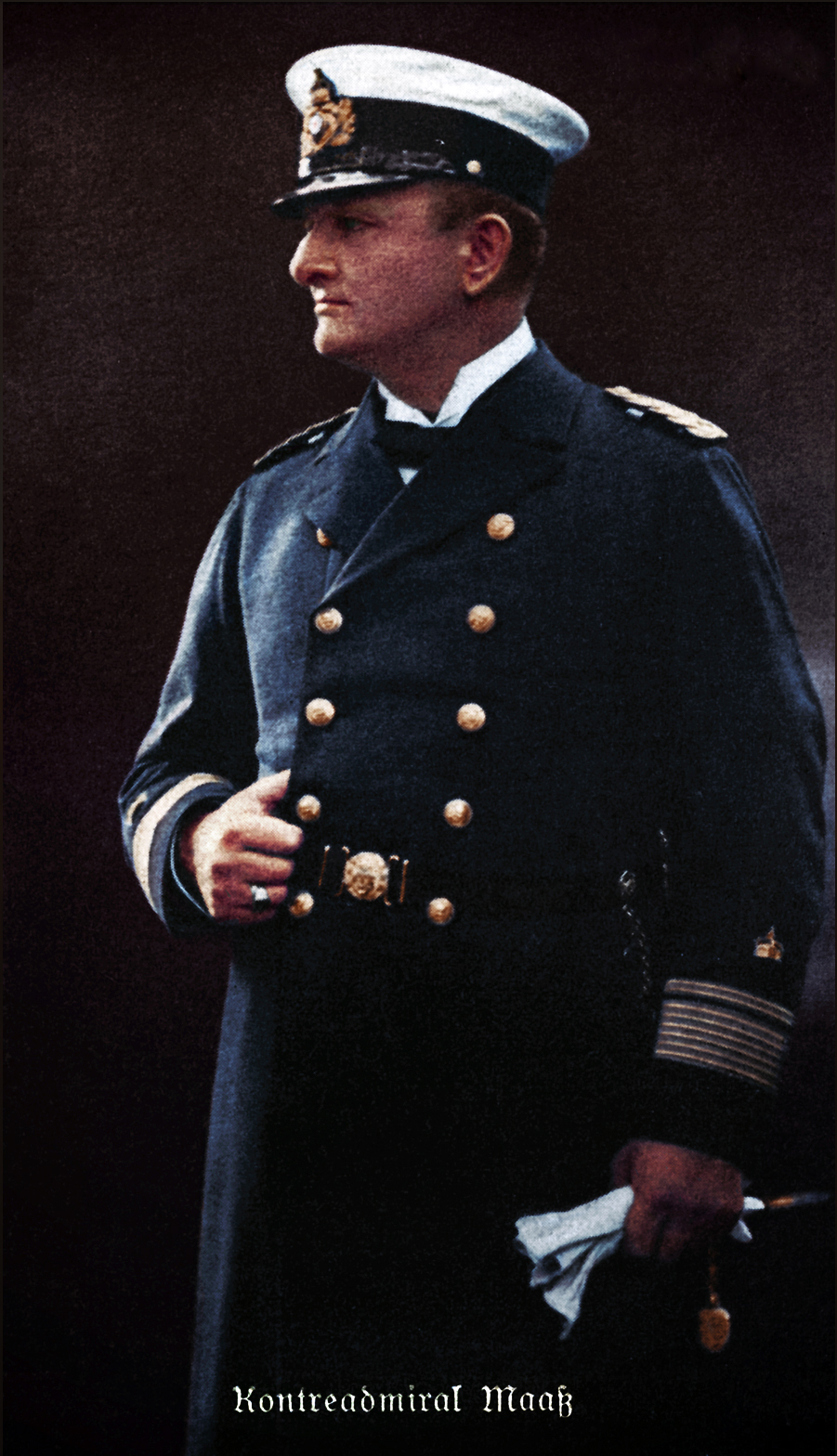
- Born: 24 November 1863; Korkenhagen, Prussia
- Died: 28 August 1914 (aged 50) SMS Cöln, Heligoland Bight, North Sea
- Allegiance: German Empire
- Branch: Imperial German Navy
- Service years: 1883–1914
- Rank: Konteradmiral (rear admiral)
- Commands: Freya; Scharnhorst; Weissenburg; II Scouting Group
- Conflicts: World War I; Battle of Heligoland Bight †

Leberecht Maass (or Maaß) (24 November 1863 – 28 August 1914) was the Konteradmiral who commanded the German naval forces at the first Battle of Heligoland Bight. He lost his life when his flagship, the light cruiser SMS Cöln, was sunk by British battlecruisers commanded by Vice Admiral David Beatty.

== Early life ==
Leberecht Maass was born in Korkenhagen, Province of Pomerania. Maass entered the German Imperial Navy in 1883. Between 1893 and 1895 Maass commanded a torpedo boat. Between 1898 and 1901 he commanded a squadron and between 1903 and 1906 he was department chief in the torpedo department. Maass served as director of the Naval School (1906-1908) and was promoted to captain in March 1908. He commanded the cruiser Freya (April 1908-June 1909), the armored cruiser Scharnhorst (March 1909-June 1910) and the old battleship Weissenburg (August 1910-September 1910). In October 1910 Maass was promoted to commander of the II Dockyard Division. On 9 December 1913 Maass was promoted to Konteradmiral, flying his flag on the cruiser Cöln. At the start of the First World War, Maass served as Leader of Torpedo Boats and commander of the II Scouting Squadron.

== Death at the Battle of Heligoland Bight ==
On 28 August 1914, the (British) Royal Navy's Harwich Force of two light cruisers, Arethusa and Fearless, and 31 destroyers and commanded by Commodore Reginald Tyrwhitt, made a raid on German ships near the German naval base at Heligoland. Providing distant cover were the battlecruisers New Zealand and Invincible of Cruiser Force K under Rear-Admiral Gordon Moore.

In the early morning hours the Harwich Force encountered German torpedo boats on patrol west of Heligoland. The Germans quickly dispatched the light cruisers Frauenlob and Stettin to the scene, joined shortly afterwards by three more light cruisers out of Wilhelmshaven, including Rear Admiral Maass's flagship, Köln, as well as Ariadne and Strassburg. They were subsequently joined by yet another light cruiser, Mainz out of Emden. Tyrwhitt's Arethusa was severely damaged by Frauenlob, but the German cruiser also suffered heavy hits and retreated to Heligoland. Tyrwhitt soon received support from Commodore Goodenough's squadron of six modern Town-class light cruisers: Southampton, Birmingham, Falmouth, Liverpool, Lowestoft and Nottingham. In the fog and smoke, Mainz found herself between Tyrwhitt's and Goodenough's forces and was sunk by them after a prolonged battle.

Called for assistance by Tyrwhitt, Admiral Beatty, whose First Battlecruiser Squadron of Lion, Queen Mary and Princess Royal had by then joined Moore's New Zealand and Invincible, arrived within little more than an hour at 12.40 p.m. and sank the hopelessly outgunned, but desperately resisting light cruisers Cöln and Ariadne.

== Namesake ==
The German navy named a World War II destroyer after Maass.
