= Heinrich Zoelly =

Mexican-Swiss engineer

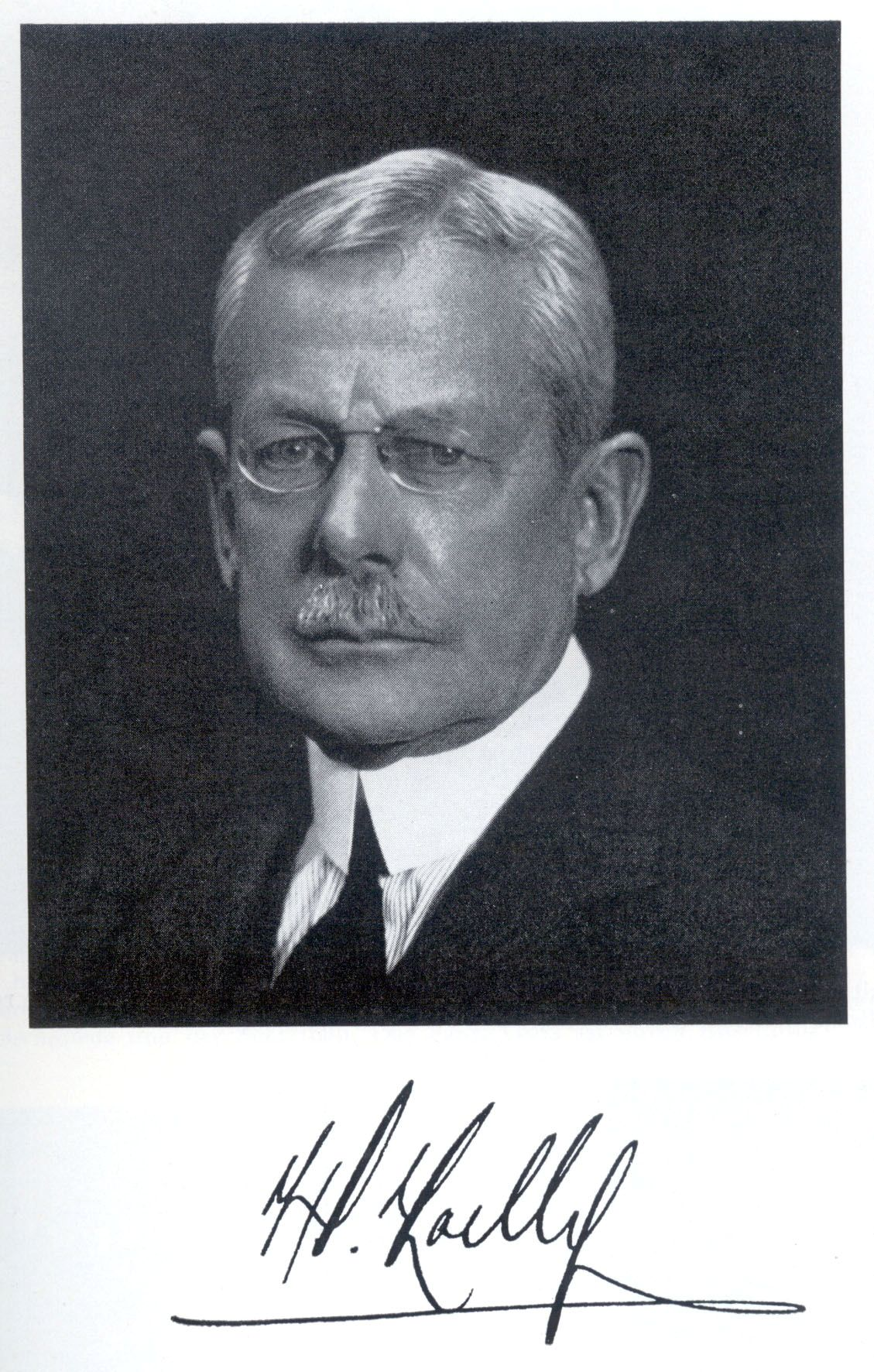
- Zoelly c. 1912
- Born: Enrique Mauricio Zoelly; 11 April 1862; Mexico City, Mexico
- Died: 30 January 1937 (aged 74); Zurich, Switzerland
- Other name: Heinrich Zoelly-Veillon
- Citizenship: Mexico (1862–1937); Germany (1862–1937); Switzerland (since 1888)
- Education: Zurich Polytechnic
- Occupations: Engineer, inventor
- Employer: Escher, Wyss & Cie.
- Spouse: Clara Veillon (m. 1888)
- Children: 5
- Relatives: Martin Bodmer (nephew)

Heinrich Moritz Zoelly (11 April 1862 – 30 January 1937) was a Mexican-born Swiss engineer and inventor who developed steam turbines and turbine-driven locomotives and patented the geothermal heat pump in 1912.

== Early life and education ==
Zoelly was born 11 April 1862 in Mexico City, Mexico, the third of five children, to German-born Franz Xaver Zoelly (1819–1894), a hat manufacturer, and Wilhelmine Julia Zoelly (née Rümmeli), originally from Klettgau in the Grand Duchy of Baden, respectively Alsace. Among his siblings was Tilly Bodmer (née Zoelly; 1866–1921), who was married to Hans Conrad Bodmer (1851–1916). His nephew is Martin Bodmer.

His father emigrated to Mexico City where he became modestly affluent through a hat factory he opened with his brother. However, due to political unrest, the family soon returned to Europe, where they settled in Zurich, Switzerland. Zoelly attended the local schools and ultimately studied mechanical engineering at the Zurich Polytechnic. He completed additional study exchanges in Mexico and Paris.

== Career ==
In 1886 Zoelly entered the service of Zurich's Maschinenfabrik Escher Wyss & Cie. He quickly became its technical director at the young age of 26. Thanks to him, the company flourished, which at this time manufactured various steam engines, water turbines, locomotives, traction engines and vessels.

His most significant development was the construction of a multi-stage steam turbine, initially used in water turbines. In 1903 Zoelly developed a multi-stage axial flow impulse turbine in collaboration with Professor Stodola. Despite low vapor pressure (11 bar) and low temperature (185 °C), this achieved a considerable output of 370 kW and a thermodynamic efficiency of 62%. The original of the first machine of this type is now at the Deutsches Museum. This turbine competed with other steam turbines developed about the same time in the world (Parsons, rake, plate, Curtis, Laval, and others) and was distributed worldwide through licensing.

In 1912 Zoelly was awarded an honorary degree from the ETH Zurich, partly thanks to his work in turbine development.

Since Zoelly was convinced of the superiority of the steam turbine to the steam piston engine, in 1913 Escher Wyss & Cie. abandoned the production of steam engines and concentrated fully on turbines. Zoelly's vision also extended to steam locomotives (which traditionally used piston engines) using steam turbines as drive. Until his resignation from Escher-Wyss Zoelly devoted himself to the development of a steam turbine-driven locomotive, which he drove forward to serviceability (1926 Zoelly- SLM), and later in 1930 Krupp Zoelly). Since diesel and electric power was increasing, the steam locomotive lost its significance.

== Personal life ==
In 1888, Zoelly married Clara Veillon (1866–1953), daughter of Charles Auguste Veillon (1833–1898), a banker, and Johanna Veillon (née Burckhardt), who belonged to the Daig in Basel. They had five children;

- Robert Zoelly (1889–1973), married Verena Veraguth, had two sons.
- Charles Auguste Zoelly (1891–1985), married Anna Mathilde Luise Steinbruch (born 1891)
- Alfred Zoelly (born 1893), married Madeleine Fatio (1899–1990), had two sons.
- Paul Zoelly (died 1971), married Margrit Schnetzler (1901–1991)
- Henri Zoelly, never married and without issue.

In the same year as his marriage, Zoelly was naturalized as Swiss citizen while residing in Hottingen. He later held multiple citizenship of Mexico, Germany and Switzerland.

Zoelly passed away 30 January 1937 in Zurich, Switzerland aged 74.

== Literature ==
- Schweizer Pioniere der Wirtschaft und Technik, Band 19: Drei Zürcher Pioniere: Paul Usteri (1853–1927) / Heinrich Zoelly (1862–1937) / Karl Bretscher (1885–1966), Zürich. Verein für wirtschaftshistorische Studien. 1968.
