= Imperial German Navy order of battle (1914) =

World War I order of battle

This is the order of battle of the Imperial German Navy (Kaiserliche Marine) on the outbreak of World War I in August 1914.

== Commanders and locations of the Imperial German Navy ==
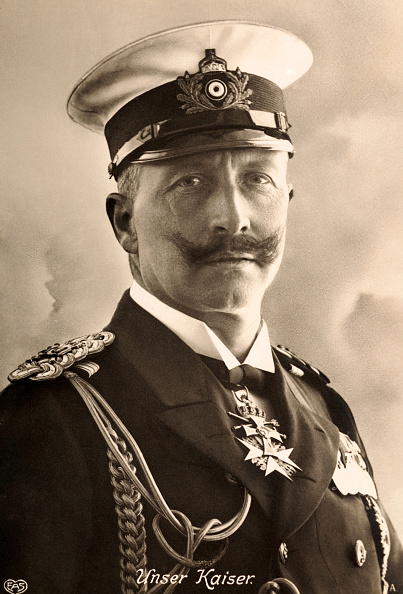
Kaiser Wilhelm II

The overall commander of the Imperial German Navy was Kaiser Wilhelm II. All authority over the navy was vested in the Kaiser, and he was ultimately responsible for all decisions regarding the navy. Under the Kaiser were a number of organisational bodies responsible for various aspects of the navy's administration and operation, each of which was directly responsible to the Kaiser:

- The Naval Cabinet was a body of the Imperial Household, with responsibility over promotions and appointments, and the drafting and issuing of the Kaiser's orders.
  - Chief of the Naval Cabinet - Admiral Georg von Müller
- The Imperial Naval Administration was the government department with responsibility for the Navy, which was answerable to the Imperial Chancellor, and was headed by the State Secretary.
  - State Secretary - Grand Admiral Alfred von Tirpitz
    - Deputy State Secretary - Vice-Admiral Eduard von Capelle

The departmental heads within the Imperial Naval Administration were:

Nautical Department	Vice-Admiral Max von Grapow
Armaments Department	Vice-Admiral Gerhart Gerdes
Shipyard Department	Vice-Admiral Karl Dick
Naval Construction Department	Vice-Admiral Friedrich Schrader
German Department	Rear-Admiral Friedrich Bodicker
States Department	Vice-Admiral Harald Dähnhardt

- The Admiralty Staff was formed in 1899 to replace the Naval High Command, and operated as an organisation intended to gather intelligence and prepare operational plans for presentation to and approval of the Kaiser.
  - Chief of the Imperial Admiralty Staff - Vice-Admiral Hugo von Pohl
    - Deputy Chief of Staff - Rear-Admiral Paul Behncke
    - Head of the Central Bureau - Rear-Admiral Albert Hopman
- The Inspector-General of the Navy was a post held intermittently, intended to undertake inspection of the navy itself to ensure it was operating at maximum efficiency. The Inspector-General's office was divided into a number of individual inspectorates related to different areas of the Navy's operations. (Note: The different inspectorates were Coast Artillery & Mines; Ship Artillery; Naval Construction; Torpedoes; Depots)
  - Inspector-General of the Navy - Grand Admiral Prince Heinrich of Prussia (Note: Prince Heinrich served as both the Inspector-General of the Navy and Commander-in-Chief of the Baltic Fleet.)
    - 2nd Inspector-General - Rear Admiral Karl Zimmerman
Senior officers of the Imperial Navy, August 1914
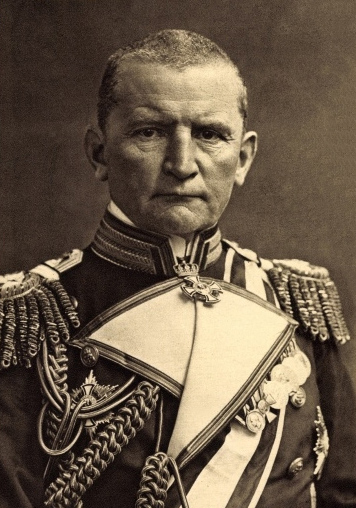
Admiral Müller,
Chief of the Naval Cabinet

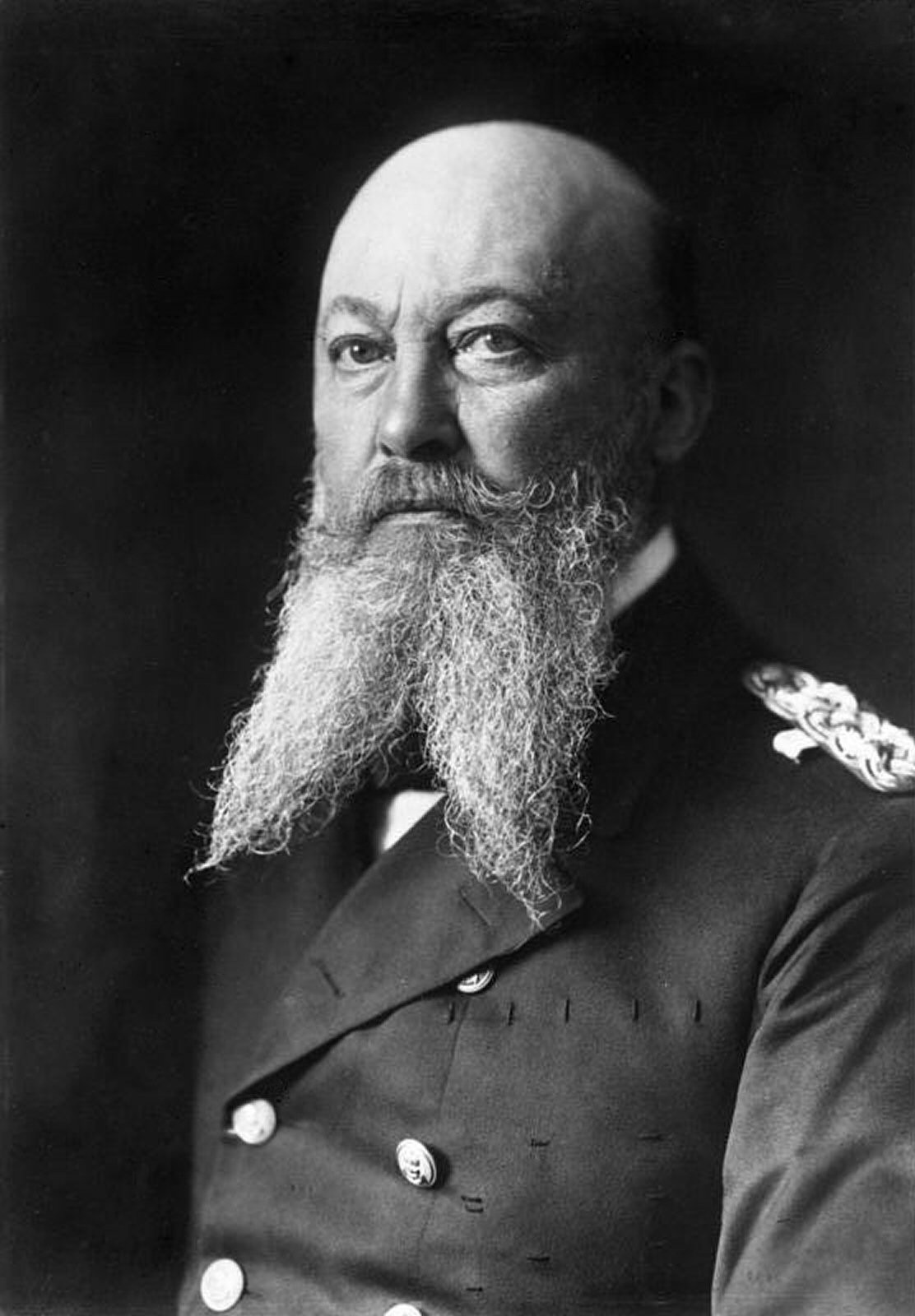
Grand Admiral Tirpitz,
State Secretary of the Imperial Navy Office

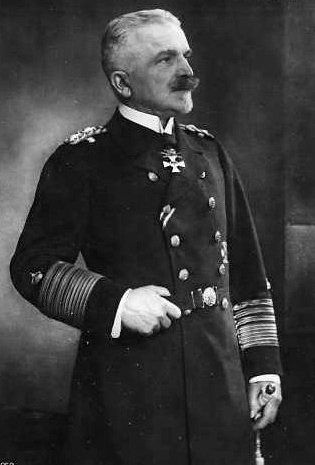
Vice-Admiral Pohl,
Chief of the Imperial Admiralty Staff

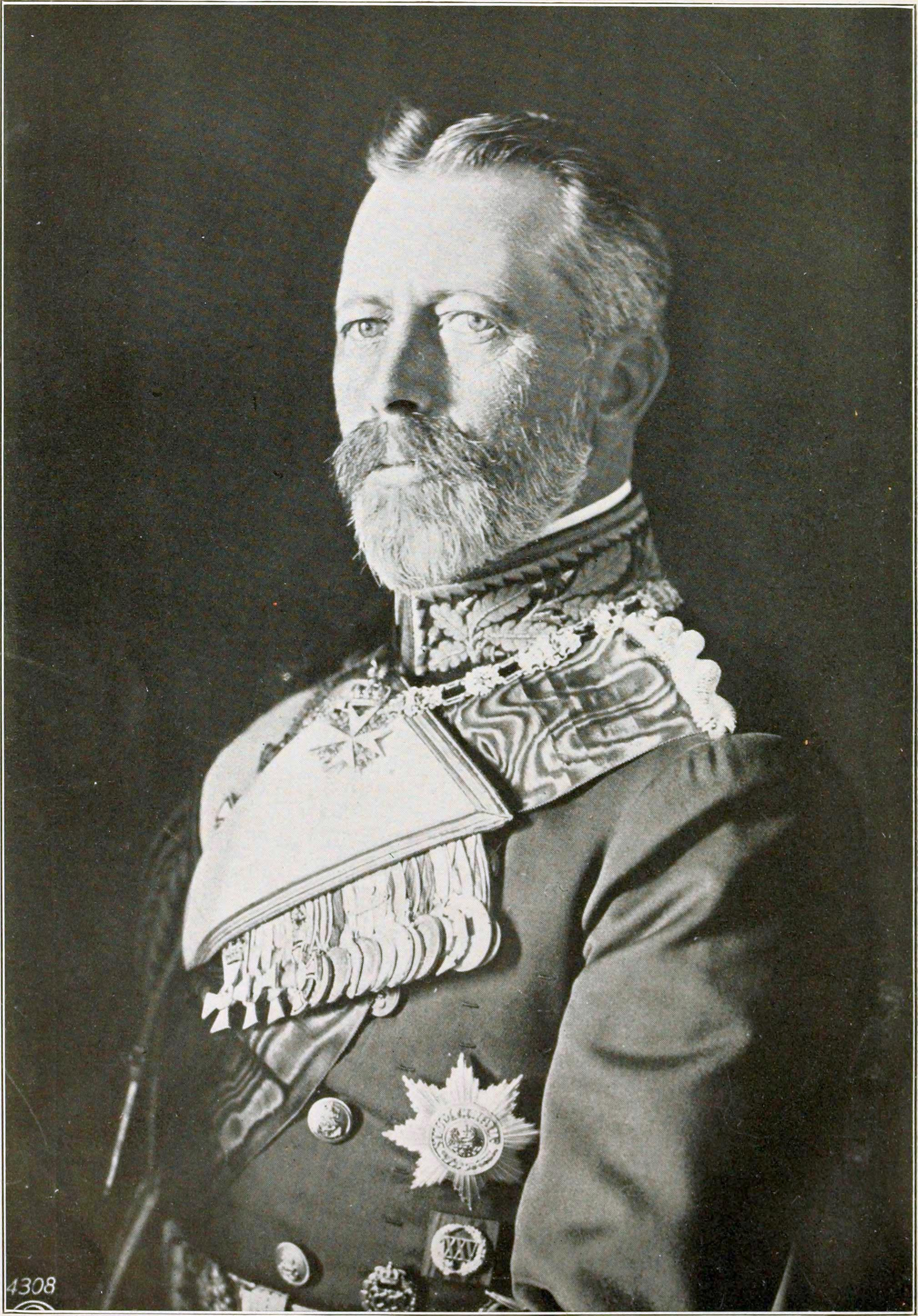
Grand Admiral Prince Heinrich of Prussia,
Inspector-General of the Navy

=== Training schools ===
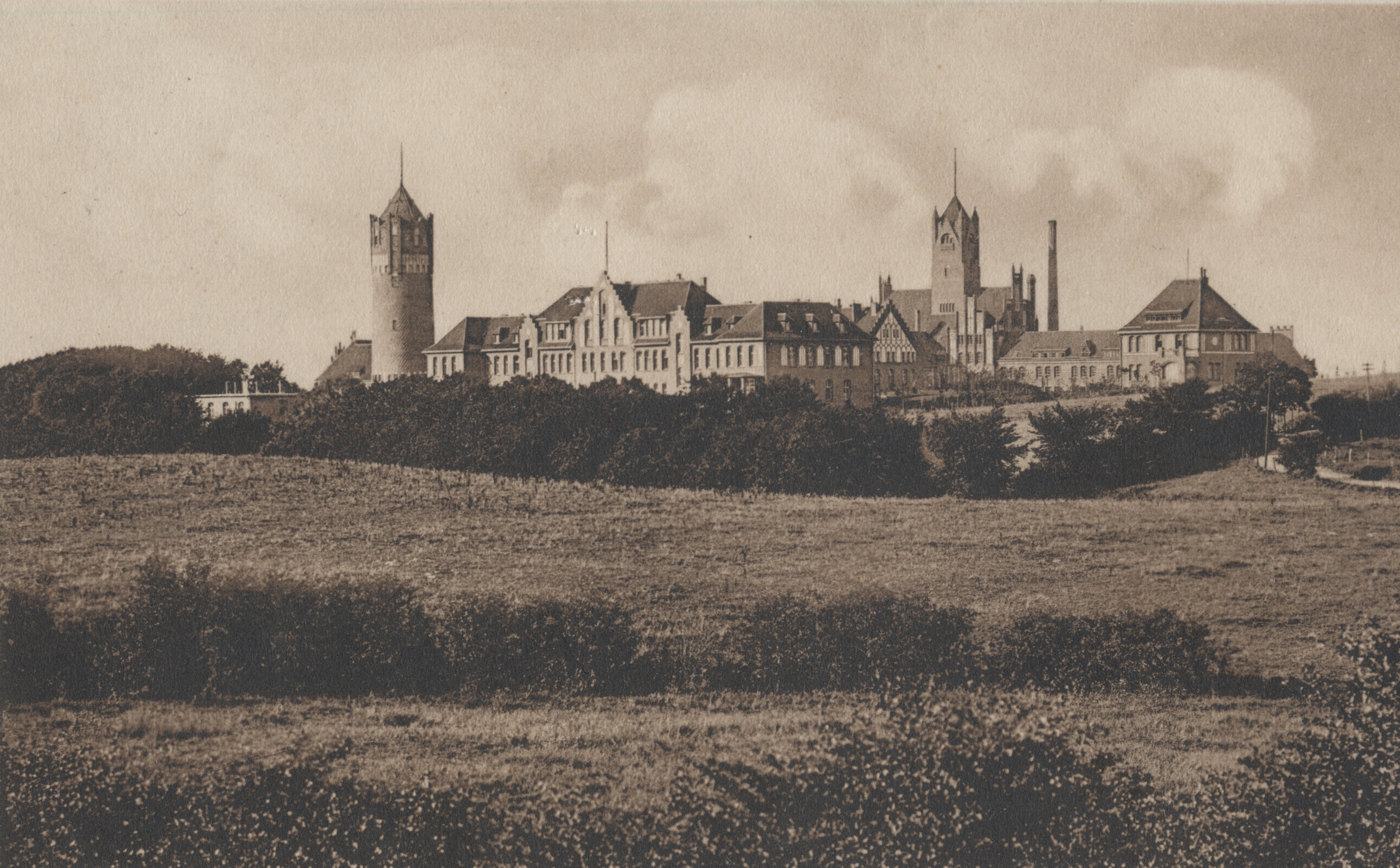
Mürwik Naval School

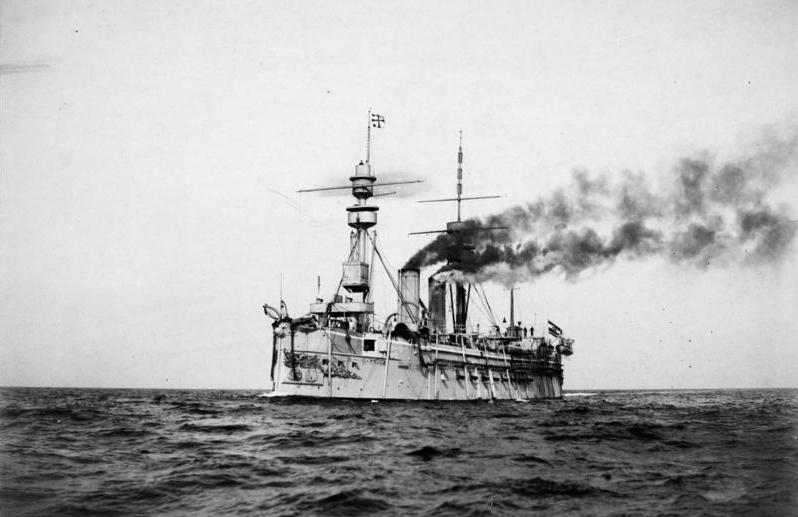
The officers' training ship König Wilhelm

The navy had a number of establishments to train its personnel, both generally and in specific technical areas. In addition, a number of ships were on the strength of training establishments to provide practical experience.

- Mürwik Naval School - primary training establishment for officers
  - SMS König Wilhelm
  - SMS Charlotte
- Boiler and Engine Room Training Schools
  - SMS Kronprinz (Boiler room training ship)
  - SMS Fürst Bismarck (Engine room training ship)
- Gunnery training school
  - SMS Kaiserin Augusta
- Torpedo training school
  - SMS Württemberg

=== German naval bases ===
Kiel and Wilhelmshaven were the main bases of the Imperial German Navy, and were connected by the Kaiser Wilhelm Canal

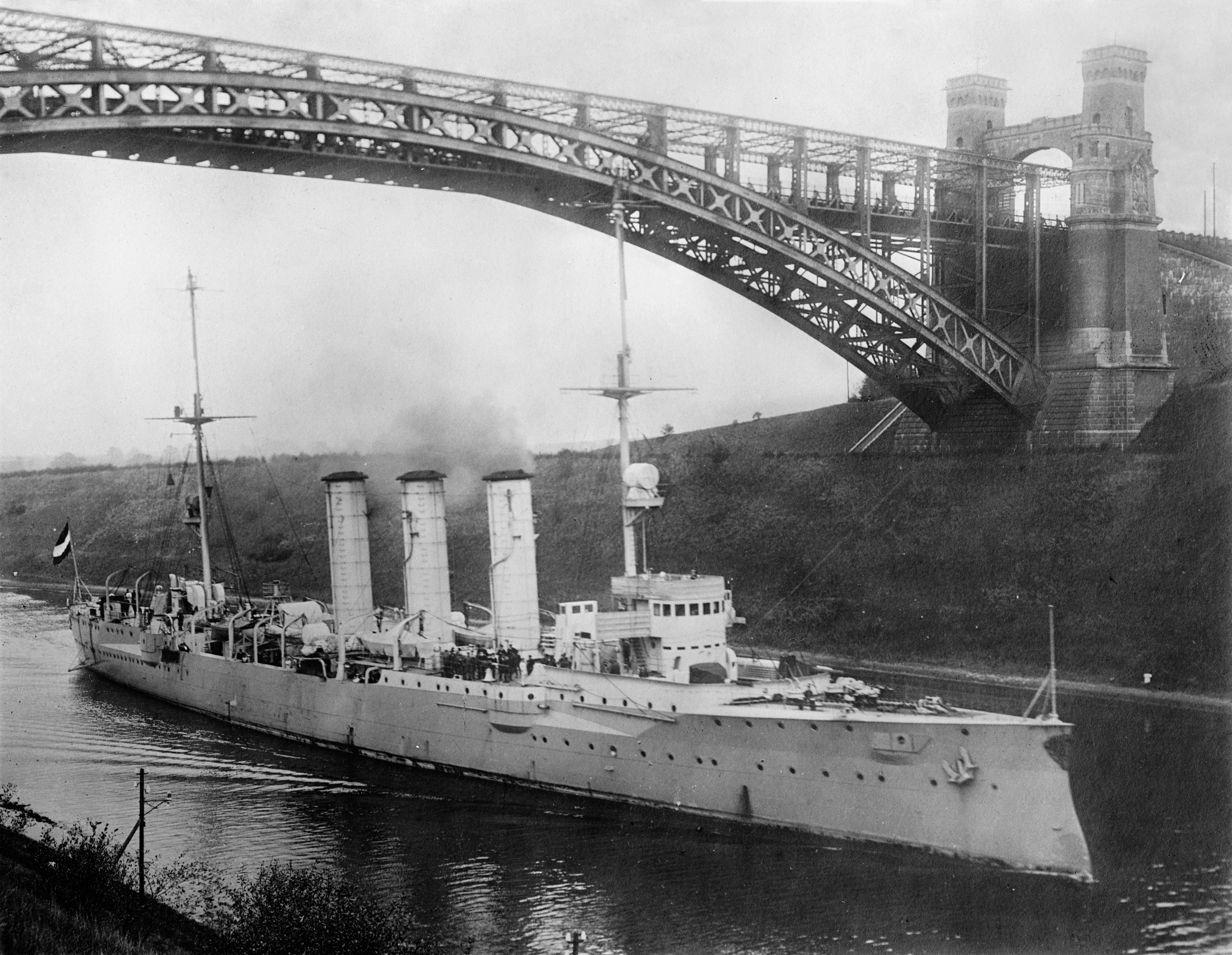
The light cruiser Dresden passing the Levensau High Bridge during a transit of the Kaiser Wilhelm Canal

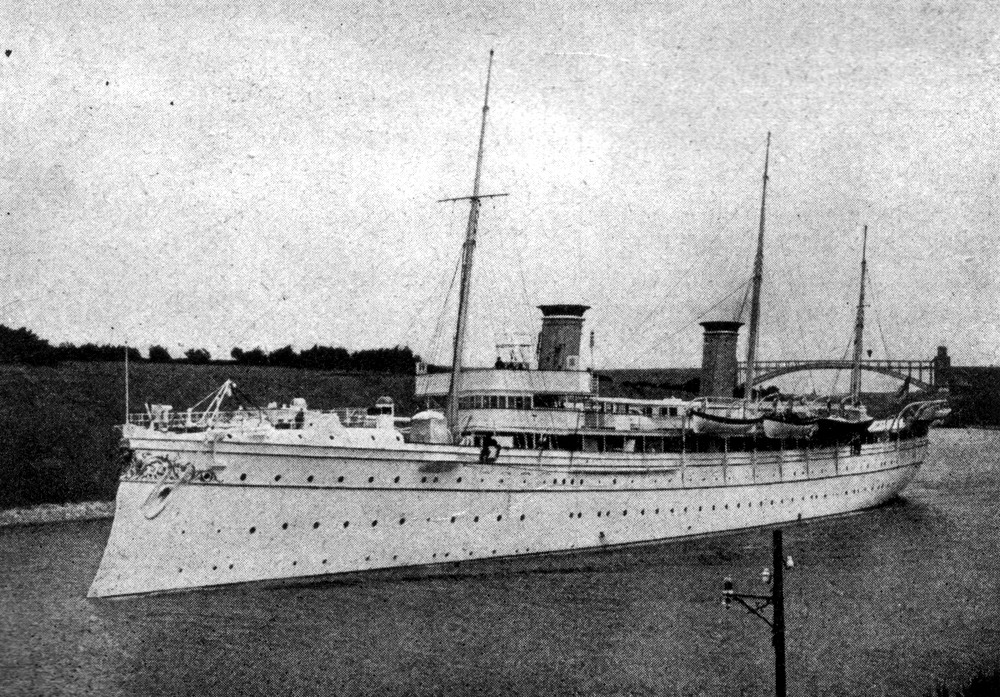
The Imperial Yacht Hohenzollern

Germany had two major naval bases covering its main areas of interest:

- Kiel - headquarters of the Baltic Naval Station, which was also responsible for the base at Danzig in East Prussia.
  - Commander, Baltic Naval Station - Vice-Admiral Gustav Bachmann
    - Chief of Staff - Rear-Admiral Georg Hebbinghaus
    - Commander, Kiel Naval Base - Vice Admiral Konrad Henkel-Gebhardi
    - Commander, Kiel Fortress - Vice Admiral Reinhard Koch
    - Commander, Danzig Naval Base - Rear Admiral Franz von Holleben
  - In addition to hosting the fleet units stationed in the Baltic Sea, a number of other units were under the direct command of the Baltic Naval Station commander:
    - 1st Seaman Division (Kiel)
    - 1st Marine Artillery Division (Friedrichsort)
    - 1st Torpedo Division (Kiel)
    - 1st Battalion of Marines
  - As well as the warships of the fleet, a further unit of the Imperial Navy stationed at Kiel was the Imperial Yacht, which was the personal vessel of the Kaiser, used both for his annual cruise to Norway as well as transporting him on overseas visits, but was also available for use as an aviso, or despatch boat.
    - SMY Hohenzollern (Note: Hohenzollern was scheduled for replacement in 1914, and was planned to be withdrawn from service at the end of the Kaiser's 1914 Norwegian cruise. A new yacht, also named Hohenzollern, was launched in September 1914, but never completed.)
- Wilhelmshaven - headquarters of the North Sea Naval Station, which also served as the host base of the High Seas Fleet.
  - Commander, North Sea Naval Station - Vice-Admiral Günther von Krosigk
    - Commander, Wilhelmshaven Naval Base - Rear-Admiral Hugo Kraft
    - Commander, Wilhelmshaven Fortress - Rear-Admiral Friedrich Schultz
    - Commander, Wesermunde Fortress - Vice-Admiral Johannes Schröder
    - Commander, Helgoland Fortress - Vice-Admiral Leo Jacobson
  - As well as hosting the High Seas Fleet, other units were also under the direct command of the North Sea Station commander:
    - 2nd Seaman Division
    - 2nd Marine Artillery Division
    - 3rd Marine Artillery Division
    - 4th Marine Artillery Division
    - 2nd Torpedo Division
    - 2nd Battalion of Marines

In addition to its two major bases in Germany, the Imperial German Navy had a number of units stationed overseas.

==== Barrack ships ====
As well as barracks ashore, the navy maintained a number of old and withdrawn ships for use as accommodation for its personnel while in harbour.

- ex-Nixe
- ex-Moltke
- ex-Sophie
- ex-Bismarck
- ex-Stein
- ex-Leipzig
- ex-Meteor
- ex-Schwalbe
- ex-Gefion
- ex-Kaiser

== High Seas Fleet ==
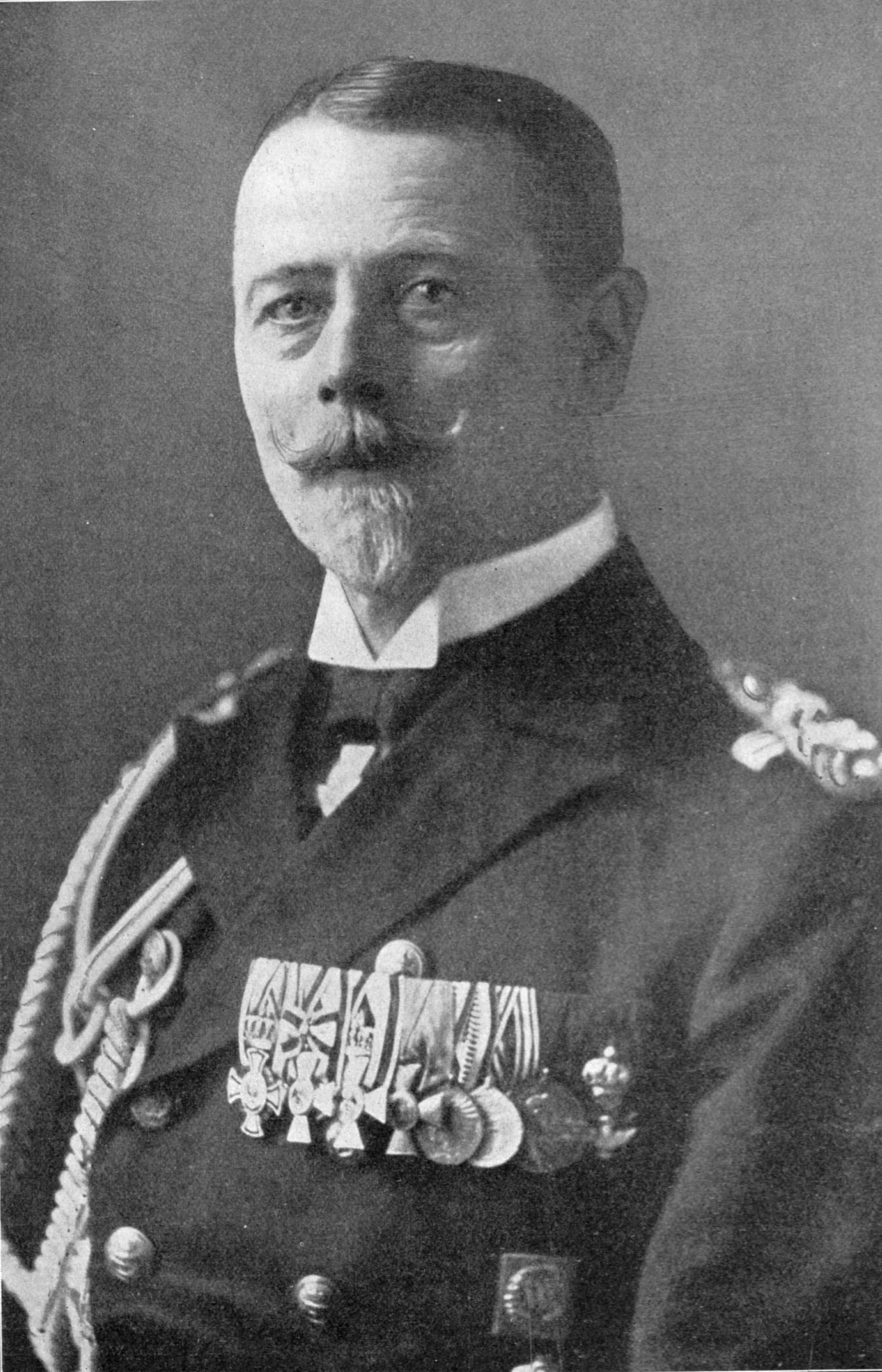
Admiral Ingenohl

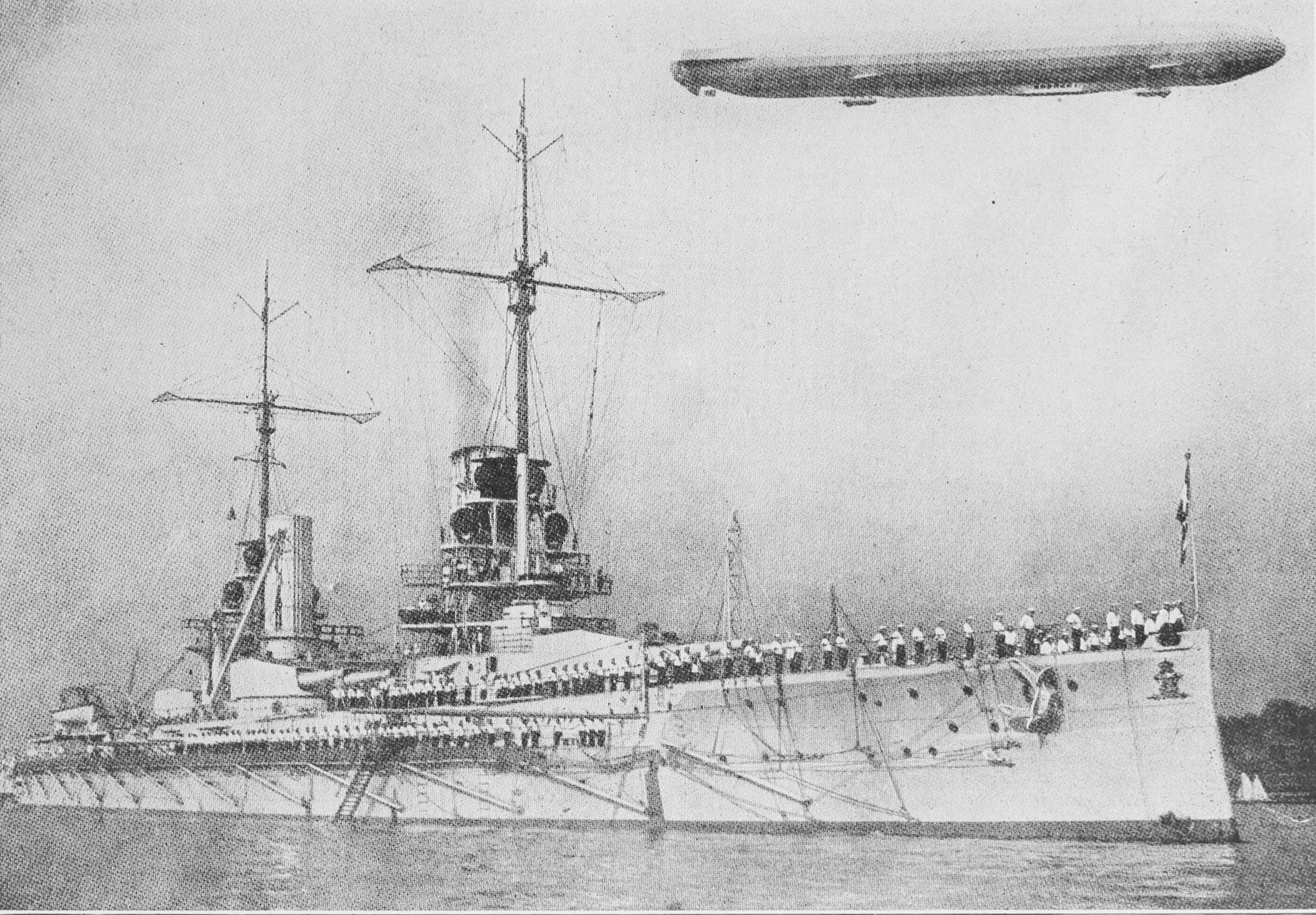
Friedrich der Grosse, flagship of the High Seas Fleet

The High Seas Fleet (Hochseeflotte) was the primary formation of the Imperial German Navy, with its main element being the three operational battle squadrons to which the navy's battleships were assigned. The majority of units of the High Seas Fleet were stationed at Wilhelmshaven for operations in the North Sea. A small force was stationed at Kiel for use in the Baltic, which could be quickly reinforced by North Sea-based units via the Kaiser Wilhelm Canal. The High Seas Fleet was under the command of Admiral Friedrich von Ingenohl.

=== Battle squadrons ===
- Fleet Flagship (Admiral Friedrich von Ingenohl)
  - SMS Friedrich der Grosse (Note: During a full mobilisation of the battle fleet, Friedrich der Grosse was attached to the 3rd Squadron alongside her Kaiser-class sister ships.)
- 1st Battle Squadron (Vice-Admiral Wilhelm von Lans)
  - 1st Division
    - SMS Ostfriesland (Flagship)
    - SMS Helgoland
    - SMS Oldenburg
    - SMS Thüringen
  - 2nd Division (Rear-Admiral Friedrich Gädecke)
    - SMS Posen (Flagship)
    - SMS Nassau
    - SMS Rheinland
    - SMS Westfalen
- 2nd Battle Squadron (Vice-Admiral Reinhard Scheer)
  - 3rd Division
    - SMS Preussen (Flagship)
    - SMS Deutschland
    - SMS Hessen
    - SMS Lothringen
  - 4th Division (Kommodore Franz Mauve)
    - SMS Hannover (Flagship)
    - SMS Pommern
    - SMS Schlesien
    - SMS Schleswig-Holstein
- 3rd Battle Squadron (Rear-Admiral Felix Funke)
  - 5th Division
    - The 5th Division, under Rear-Admiral Carl Schaumann, was formed of battleships of the König class. The first to be commissioned was Grosser Kurfürst on 30 July, which was undergoing sea trials on the outbreak of war. The remaining three ships were commissioned through the remainder of 1914. (Note: The remaining three ships of the division were König (flagship, commissioned 10 August 1914); Markgraf (commissioned 1 October 1914); and Kronprinz (commissioned 8 November 1914).)
  - 6th Division
    - SMS Prinzregent Luitpold (Flagship)
    - SMS Kaiser
    - SMS Kaiserin
    - SMS König Albert
- Tenders
  - SMS D4
  - SMS D5
  - SMS S96
  - SMS S98
  - SMS T11
  - SMS T14
  - SMS T15
  - SMS T20
  - SMS T70
  - SMS T88
  - SMS T89

=== Scouting groups ===
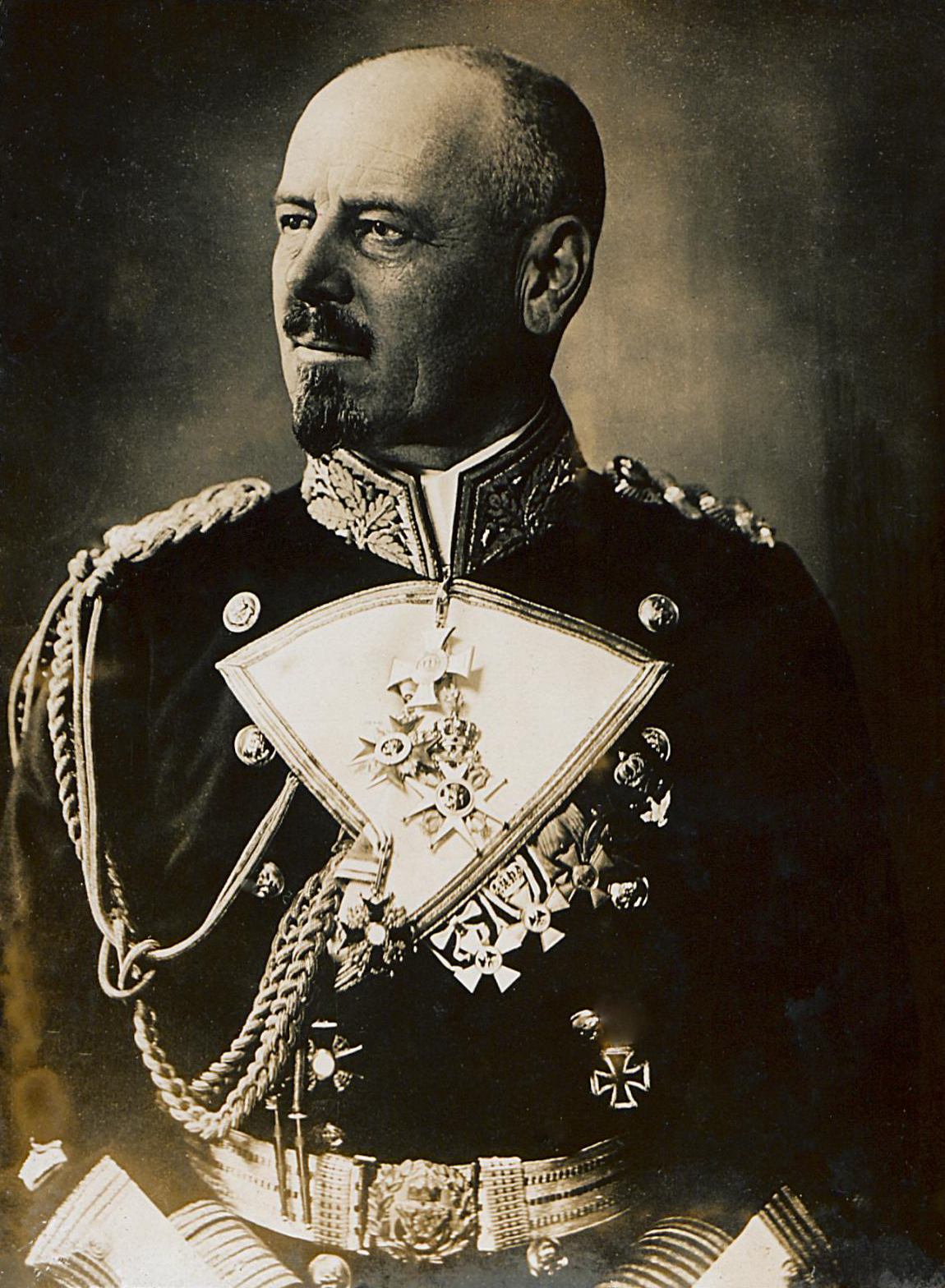
Rear-Admiral Hipper, commander of the Scouting Forces

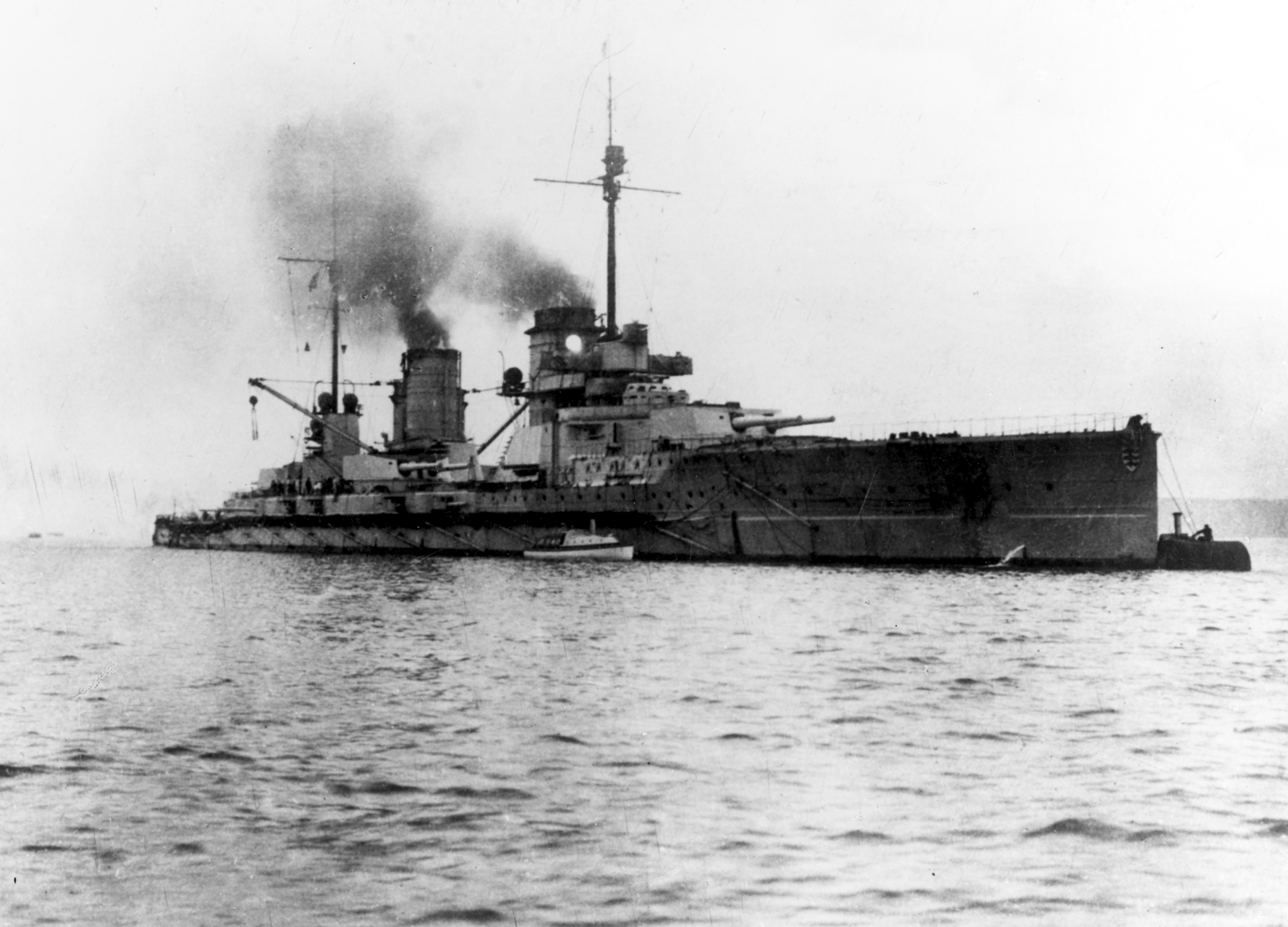
Seydlitz, flagship of the 1st Scouting Group

- 1st Scouting Group (Rear-Admiral Franz von Hipper) (Note: Derfflinger was commissioned on 1 September and was assigned to the I Scouting Group in late October)
  - SMS Seydlitz (Flagship)
  - SMS Blücher (Note: Although remaining part of the 1st Scouting Group, Blücher was deployed to the Baltic on operations for the first three months of the war)
  - SMS Moltke
  - SMS Von der Tann
- 2nd Scouting Group (Rear-Admiral Leberecht Maass) (Note: Rear-Admiral Maass also served as the commander of the fleet's Torpedo-Boats) (Note: Graudenz was commissioned on 10 August and assigned to the II Scouting Group)
  - SMS Cöln (Note: Sunk during the Battle of Heligoland, 28 August 1914) (Flagship)
  - SMS Kolberg (Note: Rostock was attached to the battle fleet and Kolberg to the scouting groups as the leaders of the fleet's torpedo boats during fleet actions)
  - SMS Mainz
  - SMS Rostock
  - SMS Stralsund
  - SMS Strassburg
- 3rd Scouting Group (No flag officer) (Note: Commodore Karl von Restorff was appointed as commanding officer on 1 January 1915) (Note: The 3rd and 4th Scouting Groups swapped identities on 25 August 1914)
  - SMS München (Flagship)
  - SMS Danzig
  - SMS Frauenlob
  - SMS Hela
  - SMS Stuttgart
- 4th Scouting Group (Rear-Admiral Hubert von Rebeur-Paschwitz)
  - SMS Roon (Flagship)
  - SMS Prinz Adalbert (Note: Prinz Adalbert was transferred to the Baltic Fleet in late August 1914)
  - SMS Prinz Heinrich
  - SMS Yorck
- 5th Scouting Group (Rear-Admiral Gisbert Jasper) (Note: The ships of the 5th Scouting Group were assigned to the Baltic Station, but remained under the command of the High Seas Fleet until September 1914)
  - SMS Hansa (Flagship)
  - SMS Hertha
  - SMS Victoria Louise
  - SMS Vineta

=== Torpedo boats ===
- 1st Torpedo Boat Flotilla
  - SMS V187 (Flotilla Leader)
  - 1st Half-Flotilla
    - SMS V188
    - SMS V189
    - SMS V190
    - SMS V191 (Leader)
    - SMS G197
  - 2nd Half-Flotilla
    - SMS G192
    - SMS G193
    - SMS G194
    - SMS G195
    - SMS G196 (Leader)
- 2nd Torpedo-Boat Flotilla
  - SMS S149 (Flotilla Leader)
  - 3rd Half-Flotilla
    - SMS S139
    - SMS S140
    - SMS S141
    - SMS S142
    - SMS S143 (Leader) (Note: S143 was sunk on 3 August 1914, and replaced by S138)
  - 4th Half-Flotilla
    - SMS S144 (Leader)
    - SMS S145
    - SMS S146
    - SMS S147
    - SMS S148
- 3rd Torpedo-Boat Flotilla
  - SMS S167 (Flotilla Leader)
  - 5th Half-Flotilla
    - SMS V162 (Leader)
    - SMS V163
    - SMS V164
    - SMS S165
    - SMS S166
  - 6th Half-Flotilla
    - SMS S168
    - SMS S169
    - SMS G170
    - SMS G172
    - SMS G173 (Leader)
- 4th Torpedo-Boat Flotilla
  - SMS G113 (Flotilla Leader)
  - 7th Half-Flotilla
    - SMS S115
    - SMS S116
    - SMS S117
    - SMS S118
    - SMS S119 (Leader)
  - 8th Half-Flotilla
    - SMS G108 (Leader)
    - SMS G109
    - SMS G110
    - SMS G111
    - SMS G112
- 5th Torpedo-Boat Flotilla
  - SMS G12 (Flotilla Leader)
  - 9th Half-Flotilla
    - SMS V2
    - SMS V3
    - SMS V4
    - SMS V5
    - SMS V6 (Leader)
  - 10th Half-Flotilla
    - SMS G7
    - SMS G8
    - SMS G9
    - SMS G10
    - SMS G11 (Leader)
- 6th Torpedo-Boat Flotilla
  - SMS V161 (Flotilla Leader)
  - 11th Half-Flotilla
    - SMS V151 (Leader)
    - SMS V152
    - SMS V153
    - SMS V154
    - SMS V155
  - 12th Half-Flotilla
    - SMS V156 (Leader)
    - SMS V157
    - SMS V158
    - SMS V159
    - SMS V160
- 7th Torpedo-Boat Flotilla
  - SMS S24 (Flotilla Leader)
  - 13th Half-Flotilla
    - SMS S14 (Leader)
    - SMS S15
    - SMS S16
    - SMS S17
    - SMS S18
  - 14th Half-Flotilla
    - SMS S19 (Leader)
    - SMS S20
    - SMS S21
    - SMS S22
    - SMS S23
- 8th Torpedo-Boat Flotilla
  - SMS G175 (Flotilla Leader)
  - 15th Half-Flotilla
    - SMS S121
    - SMS S126
    - SMS S128 (Leader)
    - SMS S130
    - SMS S131
  - 16th Half-Flotilla
    - SMS S120
    - SMS G134
    - SMS S176 (Leader)
    - SMS S177
    - SMS S179

=== U-boats and Mine warfare ===
- 1st U-boat Flotilla
  - SMS Hamburg (Flotilla Leader) (Note: Hamburg was attached to the 4th Scouting Group as the leader of the fleet's u-boats during fleet actions)
  - 1st Half-Flotilla
    - SMS V150 (Leader)
    - SM U-5
    - SM U-6
    - SM U-7
    - SM U-8
    - SM U-9
    - SM U-10
    - SM U-11
  - 2nd Half-Flotilla
    - SMS S99 (Leader)
    - SM U-12
    - SM U-13
    - SM U-14
    - SM U-15
    - SM U-16
    - SM U-17
    - SM U-18
- 2nd U-boat Flotilla
  - SMS Stettin (Flotilla Leader)
  - 3rd Half-Flotilla
    - SMS S100 (Leader)
    - SM U-19
    - SM U-20
    - SM U-21
    - SM U-22
    - SM U-24
  - 4th Half-Flotilla
    - SMS S101 (Leader)
    - SM U-23
    - SM U-25
    - SM U-26
    - SM U-27
    - SM U-28
- Tenders
  - ex-Irene
- 1st Minesweeping Division
  - SMS D3 (Leader)
  - SMS T24
  - SMS T38
  - SMS T42
  - SMS T43
  - SMS T44
  - SMS T45
  - SMS T74
  - SMS T75
  - SMS T76
  - SMS T77
  - SMS T78
  - SMS T79
  - SMS T80
  - SMS T81
- 2nd Minesweeping Division
  - SMS D6 (Leader)
  - SMS T28
  - SMS T30
  - SMS T39
  - SMS T46
  - SMS T47
  - SMS T49
  - SMS T50
  - SMS T51
  - SMS T52
  - SMS T53
  - SMS T54
  - SMS T55
  - SMS T56
  - SMS T57
- 3rd Minesweeping Division
  - SMS D8 (Leader)
  - SMS T25
  - SMS T29
  - SMS T31
  - SMS T33
  - SMS T34
  - SMS T35
  - SMS T36
  - SMS T37
  - SMS T40
  - SMS T41
  - SMS T71
  - SMS T72
  - SMS T73
- Minelayers
  - SMS Nautilus
  - SMS Albatross
  - SMS Pelikan
  - SMS Königin Luise (Note: Königin Luise was requisitioned from the Hamburg America Line on 3 August 1914 for service as an auxiliary minelayer. Two days later, during a minelaying mission to the Thames Estuary, the ship was sunk by British destroyers.)

=== Coastal defence ===
Locations of the North Sea coast defence units

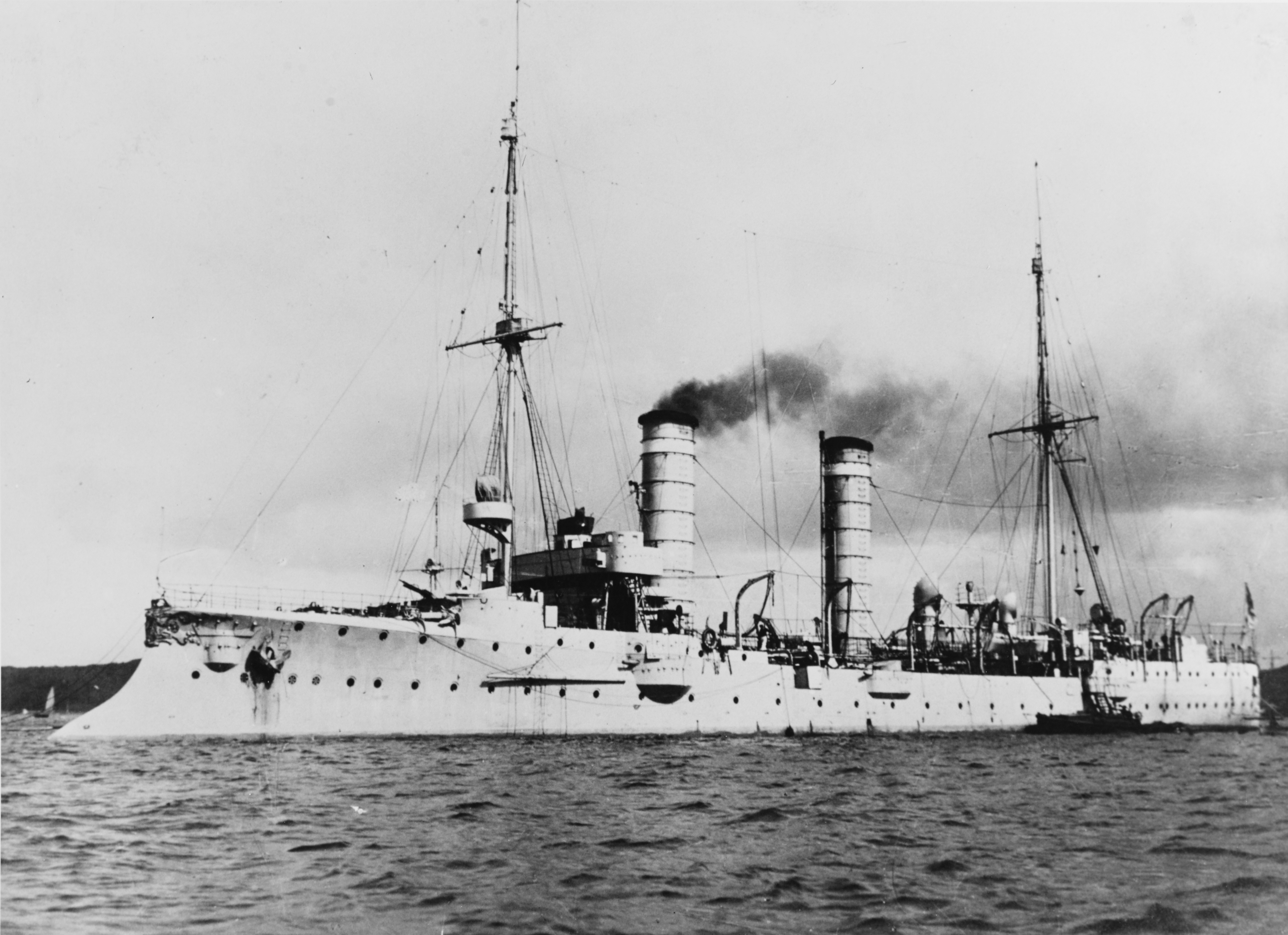
Ariadne, the lead ship of the Jade/Weser division

A number of small units were formed whose primary purpose was coastal and harbour defence of the various naval bases in and around Wilhelmshaven. These usually consisted of one or more light cruisers, commanding a number of torpedo-boat destroyers and other vessels. To provide heavy support for coastal defence, one of the reserve squadrons of the High Seas Fleet, consisting of eight obsolete coastal defence ships that were of no use as part of the main battle fleet, was assigned to the North Sea coast.

- 6th Battle Squadron (Rear-Admiral Richard Eckermann)
  - 11th Division
    - SMS Hildebrand (Flagship)
    - SMS Frithjof
    - SMS Hagen
    - SMS Heimdall
  - 12th Division (Rear-Admiral Ehler Behring)
    - SMS Agir (Flagship)
    - SMS Beowulf
    - SMS Odin
    - SMS Siegfried
- Coast Defence Division Ems (Emden)
  - SMS Arcona (Leader)
  - SMS D9
  - SMS T85
  - SMS T87
  - SMS 115
  - SMS 116
  - SMS 117
  - SMS 118
  - SMS 119
- Outpost Half-Flotilla Helgoland (Heligoland)
  - SMS D7 (Leader)
  - SMS T82
  - SMS T83
  - SMS T84
  - SMS T86
  - SMS Hela
- Coast Defence Division Jade/Weser (Wilhelmshaven)
  - SMS Ariadne (Leader)
  - SMS Berlin
  - SMS Niobe
  - SMS D2
  - SMS S95
  - SMS S103
  - SMS S107
  - SMS T61
  - SMS T62
  - SMS T66
  - SMS T68
  - SMS G132 (Note: The modern torpedo-boats V25, V26 and V186 were transferred to the North Sea station forming part of the new 9th Flotilla in October 1914. They were replaced by G132-G136.)
  - SMS G133
  - SMS G134
  - SMS G135
  - SMS G136
  - SMS Zieten
  - SMS Drache
  - SMS Blitz
- Coast Defence Division Elbe (Cuxhaven)
  - SMS Nymphe (Leader)
  - SMS Medusa
  - SMS T59
  - SMS T64
  - SMS T67
  - SMS T69
  - SMS S92
  - SMS S114
  - SMS Fuchs
  - SMS Pfeil
  - SMS Hyäne

== Baltic Fleet ==
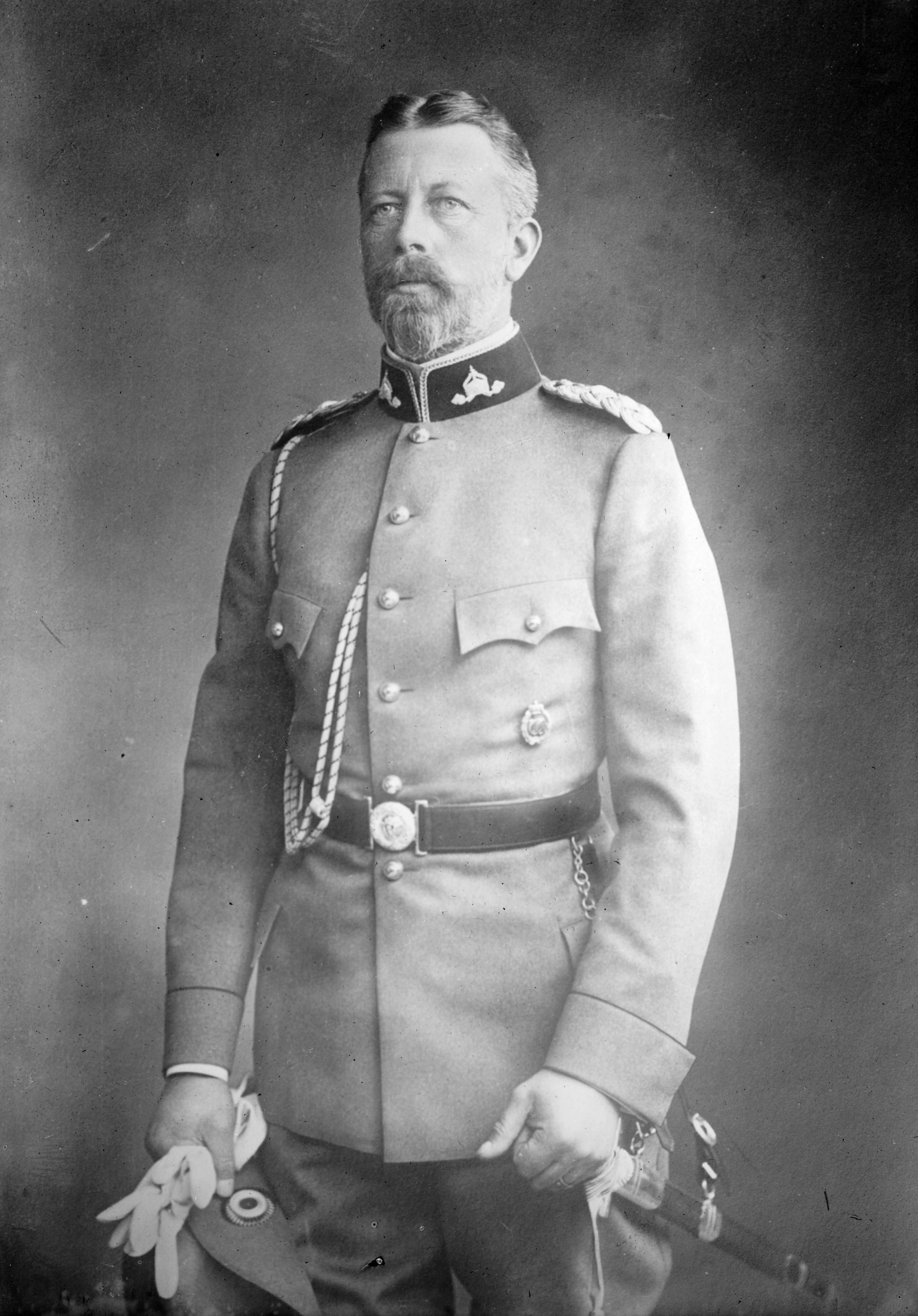
Prince Heinrich of Prussia

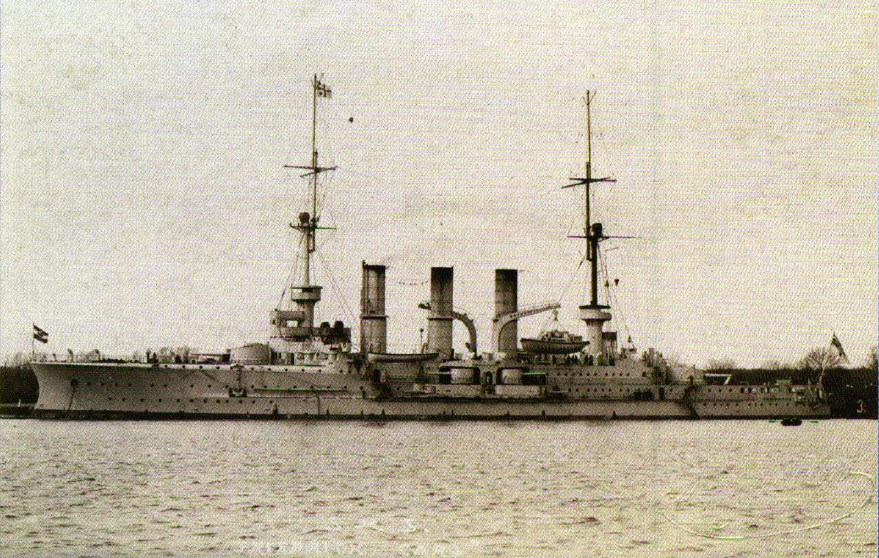
Friedrich Carl, the flagship of the Baltic Fleet

Locations of the Baltic coast defence units

Although part of the High Seas Fleet, the force stationed permanently at Kiel for operations in the Baltic operated with a degree of independence. Grand Admiral Prince Heinrich of Prussia, the brother of Kaiser Wilhelm II, was the commander-in-chief of the Baltic Fleet, with Rear-Admiral Robert Mischke in operational command of units at sea.

=== Coast Defence Group Baltic ===
- Fleet Flagship (Grand Admiral Prince Heinrich of Prussia)
  - SMS Friedrich Carl
- 6th Scouting Group (Rear-Admiral Robert Mischke) (Note: In late August 1914, the 6th Scouting Group was split into two, with Augsburg, Gazelle, Lubeck and Magdeburg being utilised as the "Detached Division" for offensive operations in the Baltic Sea.) (Note: The light cruiser Bremen was undergoing a major refit on the outbreak of war. Upon completion of the work in May 1915, Bremen was assigned to the Baltic Fleet.)
  - SMS Augsburg (Flagship)
  - SMS Amazone
  - SMS Freya (Note: Although Freya was mobilised for war service, she was employed primarily as a training ship)
  - SMS Gazelle
  - SMS Lubeck
  - SMS Magdeburg (Note: Wrecked following grounding at Osmussaar, 26 August 1914)
  - SMS Thetis
  - SMS Undine
- Other vessels
  - SMS Panther (Note: Panther had completed an overhaul at Danzig and was due to be deployed to the Caribbean on the outbreak of war.)
- Torpedo-Boat Flotilla
  - SMS D1
  - SMS V25
  - SMS V26
  - SMS S91
  - SMS S93
  - SMS S94
  - SMS S97
  - SMS S102
  - SMS S122
  - SMS S123
  - SMS S124
  - SMS S125
  - SMS S127
  - SMS S129
  - SMS V186
- U-boat Flotilla
  - SMS D10
  - SM U-1
  - SM U-2
  - SM U-3
  - SM U-4
- Minelayers
  - SMS Deutschland

=== Battle squadrons ===
- 4th Battle Squadron (Vice-Admiral Ehrhard Schmidt) (Note: The 4th and 5th Squadrons were detached from the High Seas Fleet to provide heavy support to the Baltic Fleet in August 1914.)
  - 7th Division
    - SMS Wittelsbach (Flagship)
    - SMS Mecklenburg
    - SMS Schwaben
    - SMS Wettin
  - 8th Division (Rear-Admiral Hermann Alberts)
    - SMS Braunschweig (Flagship)
    - SMS Elsass
    - SMS Zähringen
- 5th Battle Squadron (Vice-Admiral Max von Grapow)
  - 9th Division
    - SMS Kaiser Wilhelm II (Flagship)
    - SMS Kaiser Barbarossa
    - SMS Kaiser Wilhelm der Grosse
  - 10th Division (Kommodore Alfred Begas)
    - SMS Brandenburg
    - SMS Kaiser Friedrich III (Flagship)
    - SMS Kaiser Karl der Grosse
    - SMS Wörth

=== Outpost Half-Flotilla Kiel / Elder ===
- Torpedo-Boats
  - SMS T27
  - SMS T58
  - SMS T60
  - SMS T63
  - SMS T65
- Other ships
  - SMS Delphin
  - SMS Hyane
  - SMS Primus

== Naval Aviation ==
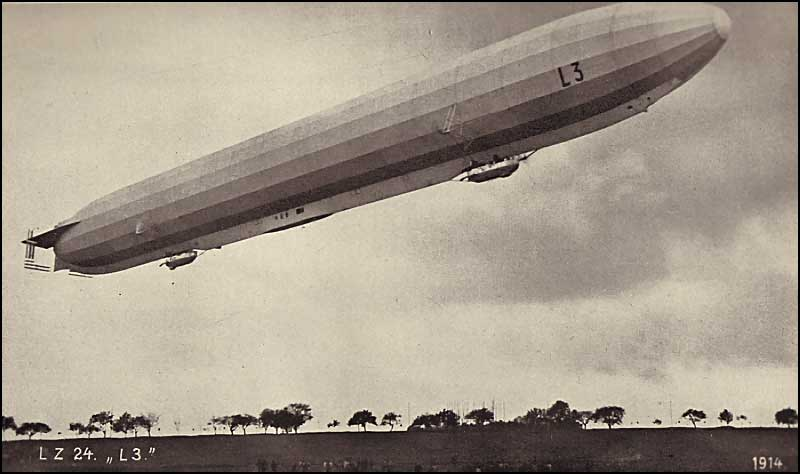
Zeppelin L 3 - the Imperial Navy's sole operational airship at the start of the war

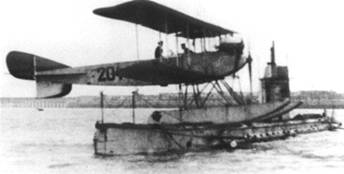
Friedrichshafen FF.29 - one of the first operational aircraft of the Naval Flying Detachment

The Imperial German Navy had a small aviation capability, which was originally formed in 1913 when the Kaiser decreed the foundation of the Naval Aviation Forces (Marinefliegerkräfte). Within the newly formed aviation section were two separate commands - the Naval Airship Detachment, based at Nordholz, near Cuxhaven, and the Naval Flying Detachment, which was split between Kiel, Heligoland and Putzig.

- Naval Airship Detachment (Note: The airship detachment had a single operational airship on the outbreak of war. By the end of 1914, another five had been commissioned)
  - Zeppelin L 3
- Naval Flying Detachment
  - 1st Naval Flying Detachment
    - Kiel Detachment
    - Heligoland Detachment
    - Putzig Detachment

== Overseas units ==
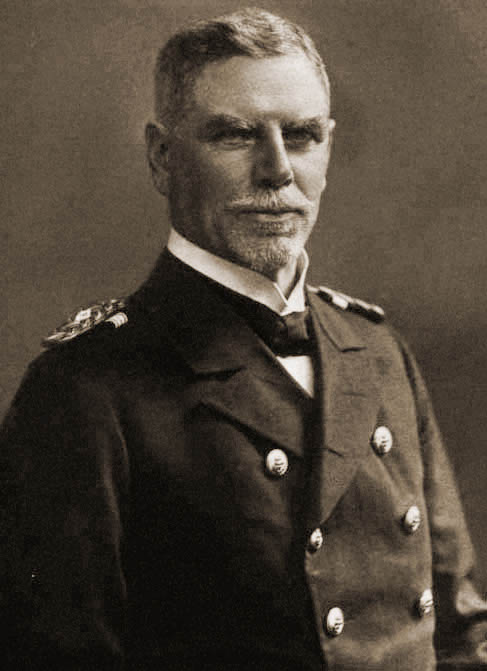
Vice-Admiral Spee

Rear-Admiral Souchon

In addition to the main body of the Imperial German Navy stationed in home waters, Germany also maintained a number of overseas deployments of ships. The majority of these were usually of one or two cruisers operating independently, with the primary formation of German warships outside German waters being the East Asia Squadron, under the command of Vice-Admiral Maximilian von Spee, which was stationed at Tsingtao (at the time the Kiautschou Bay Leased Territory). The navy also provided a significant proportion of the garrison at Tsingtao, with approximately 1,200 of the 3,000 strong garrison coming from one of the marine battalions. The other major formation was the Mediterranean Division, commanded by Rear-Admiral Wilhelm Souchon.

- East Asia Squadron (Vice-Admiral Maximilian von Spee)
  - SMS Scharnhorst (Flagship)
  - SMS Gneisenau
  - SMS Emden
  - SMS Leipzig
  - SMS Nürnberg
  - SMS Cormoran (Note: Cormoran was undergoing repairs on the outbreak of war. As a result of the work not being finished, the ship was stripped of weapons to be used to reinforce the defences of Tsingtao, and decommissioned, with her name and crew being transferred to a captured Russian merchant ship that was converted into an armed merchant cruiser.)
  - SMS Prinz Eitel Friedrich (Note: Prinz Eitel Friedrich was a liner operated by Norddeutscher Lloyd on its routes in the Far East. On the eve of war, she was ordered from Shanghai to Tsingtao for conversion into an armed merchant cruiser, and was commissioned into the Imperial Navy on 5 August 1914.)
  - SMS S90
  - SMS Iltis
  - SMS Jaguar
  - SMS Tiger
  - SMS Luchs
  - SMS Vaterland
  - SMS Otter
  - SMS Tsingtau
  - SMS Titania
- Mediterranean Division (Rear-Admiral Wilhelm Souchon)
  - SMS Goeben (Flagship) (Note: Goeben had been scheduled to be replaced by Moltke in June 1914) (Note: Sold to the Ottoman Navy on 11 August 1914)
  - SMS Breslau
  - SMS Loreley
- East and West America station
  - SMS Karlsruhe
  - SMS Dresden
- East African station
  - SMS Königsberg
  - SMS Möwe
- West African station
  - SMS Eber
- South Sea station
  - SMS Geier
  - SMS Planet
- Tsingtao Garrison
  - 3rd Battalion of Marines
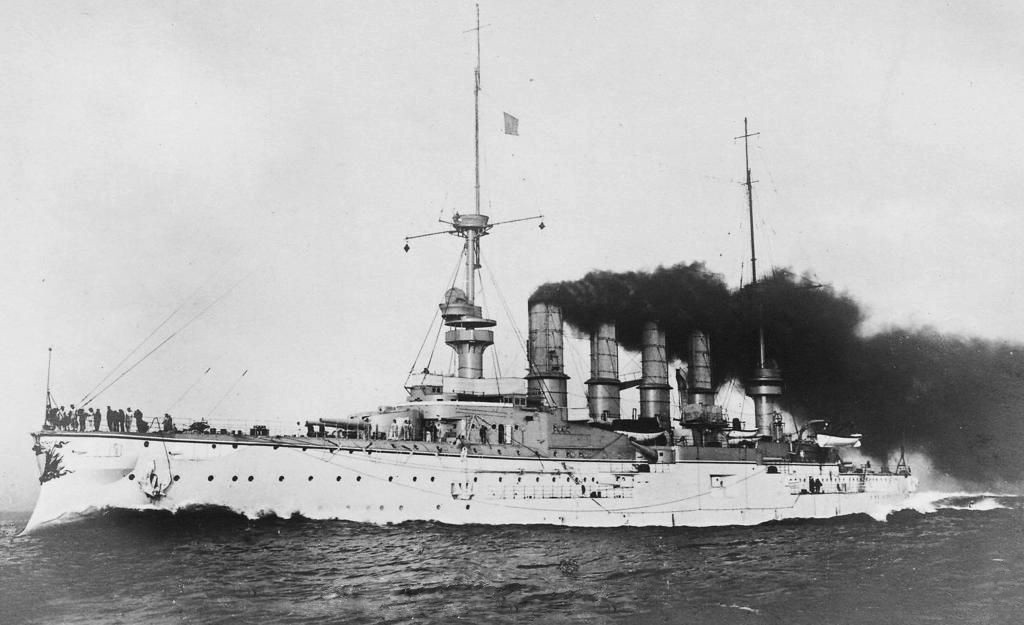
Scharnhorst, flagship of the East Asia Squadron

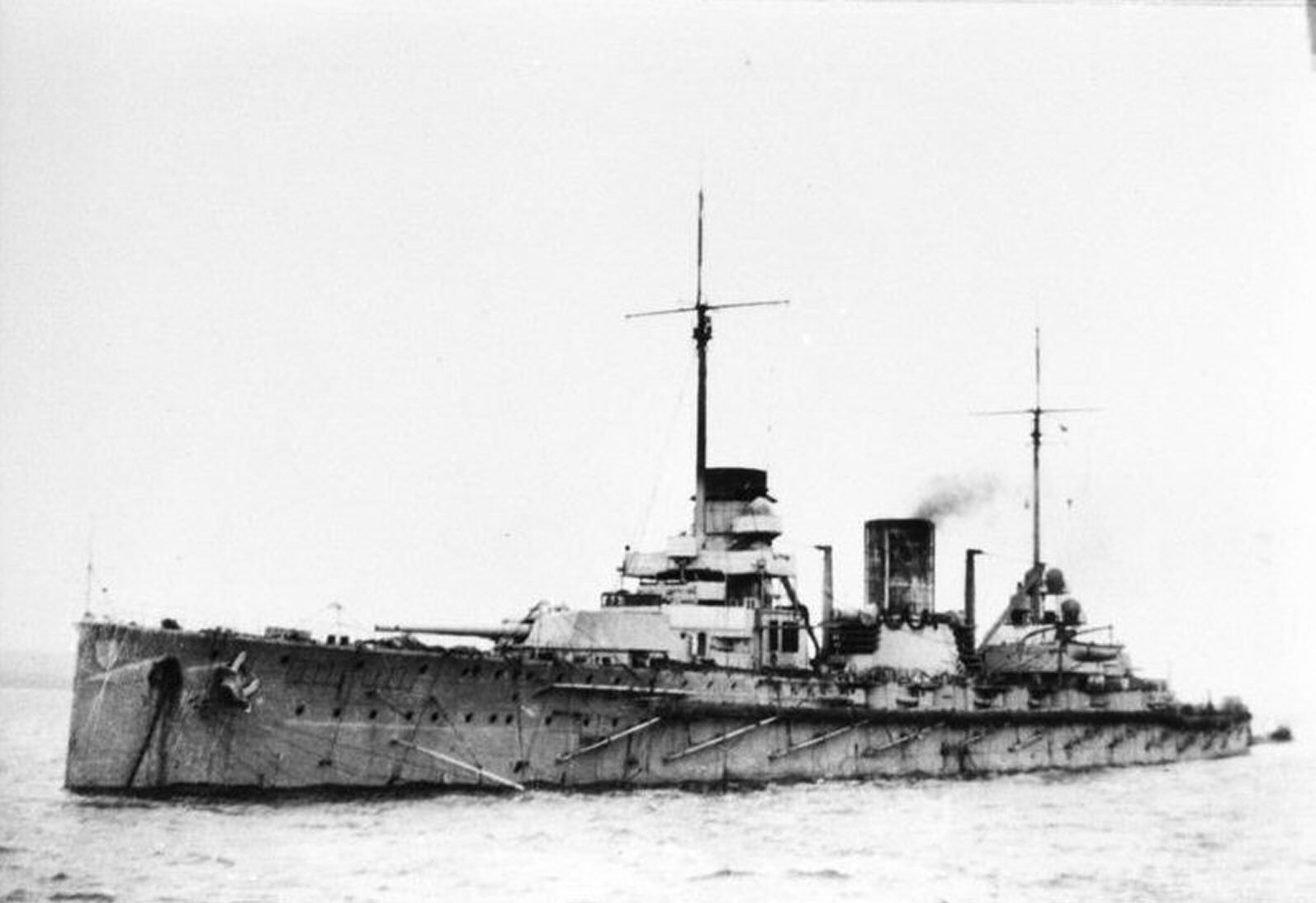
Goeben, flagship of the Mediterranean Division

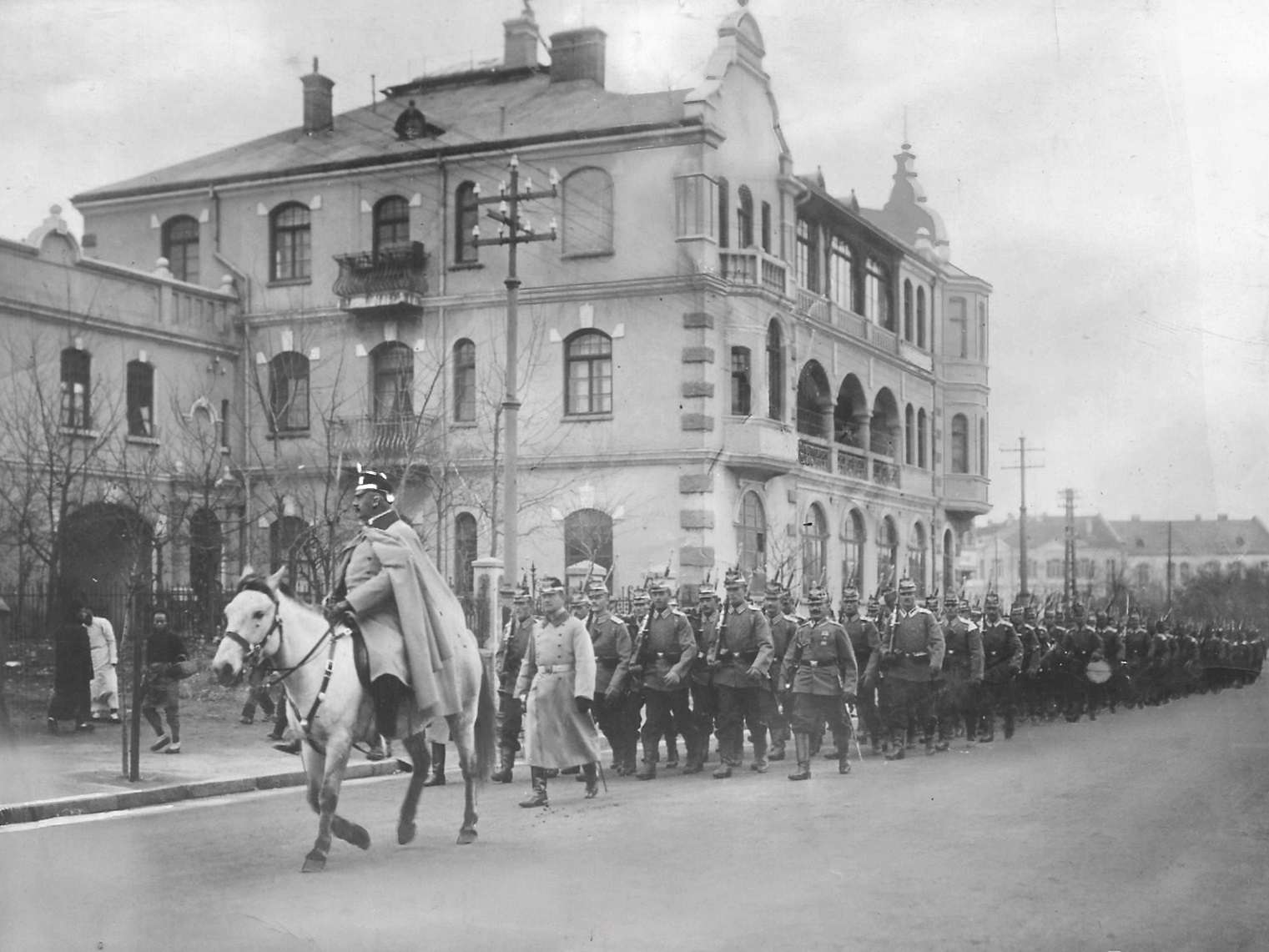
German marines in Tsingtao, 1914
