= SMS S51 (1889) =

History

German Empire
- Name: SMS S51 until 11 November 1910; SMS T51 from 11 November 1910
- Builder: Schichau-Werke, Elbing
- Launched: 28 November 1889
- Completed: 12 September 1890
- Fate: Mined and sunk 29 May 1915

General characteristics
- Displacement: 152 t (150 long tons) design
- Length: 44.20 m (145 ft 0 in)
- Beam: 5.00 m (16 ft 5 in)
- Draught: 2.70 m (8 ft 10 in)
- Installed power: 1,571 PS (1,550 ihp; 1,155 kW)
- Propulsion: 1 × Triple expansion steam engine
- Speed: 21.5 kn (24.7 mph; 39.8 km/h)
- Complement: 20
- Armament: 3× 35 cm (14 in) torpedo tubes

SMS S51 (Note: "SMS" stands for "Seiner Majestät Schiff" (transl. His Majesty's Ship)) (Note: The "S" in S51 denoted the shipbuilder who constructed her, in this case Schichau.) was a torpedo boat of the Imperial German Navy. She was built in 1889–1890 by Schichau at Elbing, as one of a large number of small torpedo boats of similar design built for the German navy. S51 was renamed T51 in 1910, and served as a minesweeper during the First World War, and was mined and sunk in the Baltic on 29 May 1915.

== Design and construction ==
In 1884, the Imperial German Navy started to build up a force of torpedo boats, ordering a number of prototypes from several shipyards, both at home and abroad. Following delivery of these prototypes, the Schichau-Werke became the principle supplier of torpedo boats to the German Navy, a position it held for many years, with large orders for torpedo boats of similar, but gradually improving design being placed.

In August 1888, an order was placed for 16 torpedo boats, S42–S57. S51 was laid down at Schichau's shipyard at Elbing, East Prussia (now Elbląg in Poland) as Yard number 412, was launched on 28 November 1889 and completed on 12 September 1890. The ship was 44.20 metres (145 ft 0 in) long, with a beam of 5.00 metres (16 ft 5 in) and a draught of 2.70 metres (8 ft 10 in). Displacement was 152 tonnes (150 long tons) full load. She was powered by a three-cylinder triple expansion steam engine, rated at 1,571 metric horsepower (1,550 ihp; 1,155 kW), fed by a single coal-fired locomotive boiler, which drove a single shaft, giving a speed of 21.5 knots (24.7 mph; 39.8 km/h). The ship was later reboilered with a water-tube boiler and converted to use oil fuel.

S51 carried three 35 cm (14 in) torpedo tubes, with a single spare torpedo carried. The ship's initial gun armament consisted of two Hotchkiss Revolving Cannon, which was replaced by a 5 cm SK L/40 gun from 1893. (Note: SK stood for Schnellfeuerkanone (quick-firing gun).) (Note: In Imperial German Navy gun nomenclature, the L/40 denotes the length of the gun. In this case, the L/40 gun is 40 caliber, meaning that the gun is 40 times as long as it is in diameter.) The ship had a crew of 20.

== Service ==
By 1908, S51 was used as a minesweeper, being a member of the 2nd Minesweeping Division. On 11 November 1910, along with a large number of other old torpedo boats, S51 was redesignated to free the 'S' numbers for new construction, with the ship becoming T51.

T51 remained part of the 2nd Minesweeping Division into 1914. T51 was still a member of the 2nd Minesweeping Division as the German High Seas Fleet mobilised after the start of the First World War. From 20 to 26 September 1914, the 2nd Minesweeping Division, including T51, took part in an operation by the German Baltic Sea forces, supported by units of the High Seas Fleet, aimed at simulating an amphibious landing at Windau (now Ventspils), Latvia. The operation was abandoned after reports of British submarines penetrating the Baltic. In April 1915, the 2nd Minesweeping division was permanently transferred to the Baltic. Towards the end of May 1915, the 2nd Minesweeping division was tasked with clearing a minefield to the east of Ertholmene where the cruiser Augsburg had been damaged in January. On 28 May, two minesweepers of the division, T49 and T54 were damaged by mines north of Rixhöft, and were towed to safety at Danzig. Operations to search for and sweep mines in the minefield continued, and on the evening of 29 May T51 and T47 struck mines near the Stolpe Bank. T47 broke in two and quickly sank, with the loss of 20 of her crew, while T51, which had been badly damaged forward, stayed afloat for long enough for the torpedo boat T107 to rescue her crew.
