= SMS V4 =

History

German Empire
- Ordered: 1911
- Builder: AG Vulcan Stettin, Germany
- Launched: 23 December 1911
- Commissioned: 15 June 1912
- Fate: Sunk 1 June 1916

General characteristics
- Displacement: 697 t (686 long tons)
- Length: 71.1 m (233 ft 3 in) oa
- Beam: 7.6 m (24 ft 11 in)
- Draft: 3.11 m (10 ft 2 in)
- Propulsion: 4× water-tube boilers; 2× steam turbines; 17,000 metric horsepower (17,000 shp; 13,000 kW)
- Speed: 32 knots (59.3 km/h; 36.8 mph)
- Range: 1,190 nmi (2,200 km; 1,370 mi) at 17 knots (31 km/h; 20 mph)
- Complement: 74 officers and sailors
- Armament: 2 × 8.8 cm (3.5 in) SK L/30 guns; 4 × 500 mm torpedo tubes

SMS V4 (Note: "SMS" stands for "Seiner Majestät Schiff" (German: His Majesty's Ship)) was a V1-class torpedo boat of the Imperial German Navy. The ship was built by AG Vulcan, completing in 1912. She served in the First World War and was sunk at the Battle of Jutland on 1 June 1916.

== Construction and design ==
In 1911, the Imperial German Navy placed orders for a flotilla of 12 torpedo boats as part of its shipbuilding programme for that year, with one half flotilla of six ordered from AG Vulcan, and six from Germaniawerft. (Note: The Imperial German Navy's practice was to split a year's orders into half-flotillas of six torpedo boats from different builders, to differing detailed design.) The 1911 torpedo boats were smaller than those ordered in recent years in order to be more manoeuvrable and so work better with the fleet, which resulted in the numbering series for torpedo boats being restarted. The reduction in size resulted in the ships' seaworthiness being adversely affected.

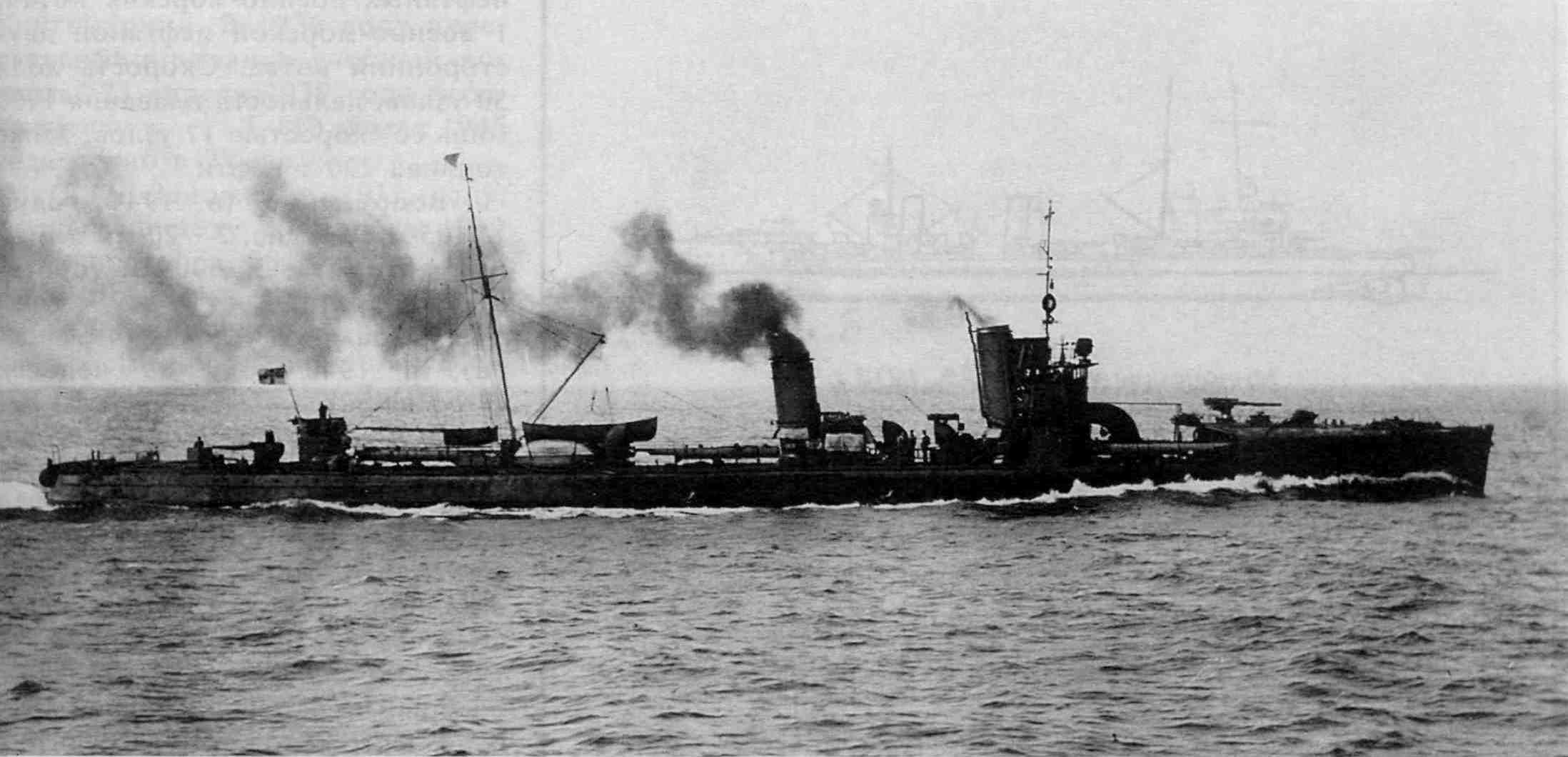
Sister ship V2

V4 (Note: The "V" in V4 denotes the shipyard at which she was built.) was launched from Vulcan's Stettin, Prussia (now Szczecin in Poland) shipyard on 23 December 1911 and commissioned on 15 June 1912.

The ship was 71.1 metres (233 ft 3 in) long overall and 70.2 metres (230 ft 4 in) at the waterline, with a beam of 7.6 metres (24 ft 11 in) and a draught of 3.11 metres (10 ft 2 in). Displacement was 569 tonnes (560 long tons) normal and 697 tonnes (686 long tons) deep load. Three coal-fired and one oil-fired water-tube boilers fed steam to two direct-drive steam turbines rated at 17,000 metric horsepower (17,000 shp; 13,000 kW), giving a design speed of 32 knots (59 km/h; 37 mph). 107 tonnes (105 long tons) of coal and 78 tonnes (77 long tons) of oil were carried, giving a range of 1,190 nautical miles (2,200 km; 1,370 mi) at 17 knots (31 km/h; 20 mph) or 490 nautical miles (910 km; 560 mi) at 29 knots (54 km/h; 33 mph).

Armament consisted of two 8.8 cm (3.5 in) SK L/30 naval guns (Note: In Imperial German Navy gun nomenclature, the L/30 denotes the length of the gun. In this case, the L/30 gun is 30 caliber, meaning that the gun is 30 times as long as it is in diameter.) in single mounts fore and aft, together with four 50 cm (19.7 in) torpedo tubes with one reload torpedo carried. Up to 18 mines could be carried. In 1916 the L/30 guns were replaced by more powerful 8.8 cm (3.5 in) SK L/45 guns. The ship had a crew of 74 officers and other ranks.

== Service ==
In May 1914 V4 was part of the 10th Half-Flotilla, 5th Torpedo Boat Flotilla. On 28 August 1914, a British force of destroyers and cruisers supported by battlecruisers made a sortie into the Heligoland Bight in order to ambush German torpedo boats on patrol, which caused the Battle of Heligoland Bight. The 5th Torpedo Boat Flotilla, including V4, were sent out from Heligoland to investigate sightings of British submarines (which were deployed as bait to draw out German ships), and ran into several British destroyers. The Flotilla then turned away to try and escape the trap, but V4's sister ship V1 could not make full speed and was hit several times by British shells before the arrival of the German cruiser Stettin allowed the 5th Flotilla to escape. In total, however, three German light cruisers (Ariadne, Cöln and Mainz) and one torpedo boat of the German outer screen (V187) had been sunk. V4 was also present at the Battle of Dogger Bank on 24 January 1915.

At the Battle of Jutland on 31 May–1 June 1916, V4 remained part of the 10th Half-Flotilla, 5th Torpedo Boat Flotilla, operating in support of the main German battle fleet. At about 03:15 hr CET (i.e. 02:15 hr GMT) the 5th Flotilla was accompanying the German Fleet on its journey back to base when a large underwater explosion, probably due to a floating mine, blew the bows off V4, killing 18 and wounding four. After the survivors were rescued, sister ship V6 scuttled V4 with shellfire and a torpedo.

== See also ==
- German ocean-going torpedo boats of World War I
