= SMS G12 =

1912 German V1-class torpedo boat

History

German Empire
- Name: SMS G12
- Builder: Germaniawerft, Kiel
- Launched: 15 July 1912
- Completed: 17 October 1912
- Fate: Sunk 8 September 1915

General characteristics
- Class & type: V1-class torpedo boat
- Displacement: 573 t (564 long tons) design
- Length: 71.5 m (234 ft 7 in) o/a
- Beam: 7.6 m (24 ft 11 in)
- Draught: 3.0 m (9 ft 10 in)
- Installed power: 16,000 PS (16,000 shp; 12,000 kW)
- Propulsion: 4 × boilers; 2 × Germania steam turbines
- Speed: 32 kn (37 mph; 59 km/h)
- Complement: 74
- Armament: 2× 8.8 cm guns; 4× 50 cm torpedo tubes

SMS G12 (Note: "SMS" stands for "Seiner Majestät Schiff" (transl. His Majesty's Ship)) (Note: The "G" in G11 denoted the shipbuilder who constructed the ship, in this case Germaniawerft.) was a V1-class large torpedo boat of the Imperial German Navy. She was built by the Germaniawerft shipyard at Kiel between 1911 and 1912.

G12 served during the First World War. She was sunk following a collision on 8 September 1915.

== Design and construction ==
In the first decade of the 20th century, the Imperial German Navy had generally ordered twelve large torpedo boats (Große Torpedoboote) as part of each year's construction programme, with a gradual evolution of design in each year's orders, with speed, range and seaworthiness improving year-on-year. These changes resulted in the ships becoming larger, and concerns grew that the torpedo boats were becoming too big to manoeuvre in and out of the battle fleet. For the 1911 fiscal year's orders, it was decided to revert to a smaller design, with the numbering system for torpedo boats restarting as a consequence. As was normal practice, that year's order was split between two shipyards, with six (V1–V6) to be built by AG Vulcan and six (G7–G12) by Germaniawerft, with detailed design differing between the two shipyards.

Germaniawerft's design was 71.5 metres (234 ft 7 in) long overall and 71.0 metres (232 ft 11 in) between perpendiculars, with a beam of 7.56 metres (24 ft 10 in) and a draught of 3.09 metres (10 ft 2 in). Displacement was 573 tonnes (564 long tons) design and 719 tonnes (708 long tons) full load.

Three coal-fired and one oil-fired water-tube boiler fed steam at a pressure of 18 standard atmospheres (260 psi) to two sets of direct-drive steam turbines. The ship's machinery was rated at 16,000 PS (16,000 shp; 12,000 kW) giving a design speed of 32 knots (37 mph; 59 km/h). 110 tons of coal and 80 tons of oil fuel were carried, giving an endurance of 1,150 nautical miles (1,320 mi; 2,130 km) at 17 knots (20 mph; 31 km/h).

The ship was armed with two 8.8 cm SK L/30 naval guns, (Note: SK stood for Schnellfeuerkanone (quick-firing gun).) (Note: In Imperial German Navy gun nomenclature, the L/45 denotes the length of the gun. In this case, the L/45 gun is 45 caliber, meaning that the gun is 45 times as long as it is in diameter.) one on the forecastle and one aft. Four single 50 cm (19.7 in) torpedo tubes were fitted, with two on the ship's beam in the gap between the forecastle and the ship's bridge which were capable of firing straight ahead, and two on the ship's centreline aft of the funnels. 18 mines could be carried. The ship had a crew of 74 officers and men.

G12 was laid down at Germaniawerft's Kiel shipyard as yard number 175, was launched on 15 July 1912 and completed on 17 October 1912.

== Service ==
G12 joined the 5th Torpedo boat flotilla, becoming leader of the flotilla.

=== First World War ===
G12 remained the leader of the 5th Torpedo boat flotilla of the German High Seas Fleet on the outbreak of war. On 28 August 1914, the British Harwich Force, supported by light cruisers and battlecruisers of the Grand Fleet, carried out a raid towards Heligoland with the intention of destroying patrolling German torpedo boats. The German defensive patrols around Heligoland consisted of one flotilla (the 1st Torpedo-boat Flotilla) of 12 modern torpedo boats forming an outer patrol line about 25 nautical miles (29 mi; 46 km) North and West of Heligoland, with an inner line of older torpedo boats of the 3rd Minesweeping Division at about 12 nautical miles (14 mi; 22 km). The 5th Torpedo-boat flotilla, together with four German light cruisers, waited near Heligoland in support. The 5th Torpedo-boat Flotilla, including G12, were sent out from Heligoland to investigate sightings of British submarines, and ran into several British destroyers. The Flotilla then turned away to try and escape the trap, but the torpedo boat V1, which along with S13 could not make full speed and lagged behind the rest of the flotilla, was hit by British shells before the arrival of the German cruiser Stettin allowed the 5th Flotilla to escape. The torpedo boat V187 of the outer screen did not manage to evade the British force and was sunk. The intervention of the supporting British forces resulted in the sinking of the German cruisers Mainz, Cöln and Ariadne. The British light cruiser Arethusa and destroyers Laurel, Laertes and Liberty were badly damaged but safely returned to base. G12 was undamaged.

On 23 January 1915, a German force of Battlecruisers and light cruisers, escorted by torpedo boats, and commanded by Admiral Franz von Hipper, made a sortie to attack British fishing boats on the Dogger Bank. G21 led the 5th Tprpedo-boat flotilla as part of the escort for Hipper's force. British Naval Intelligence was warned of the raid by radio messages decoded by Room 40, and sent out the Battlecruiser Force from Rosyth, commanded by Admiral Beatty aboard Lion and the Harwich Force of light cruisers and destroyers, to intercept the German force. The British and German Forces met on the morning of 24 January in the Battle of Dogger Bank. On sighting the British, Hipper ordered his ships to head south-east to escape the British, who set off in pursuit. The armoured cruiser Blücher was disabled by British shells and was sunk, but the rest of the German force escaped, with the German battlecruiser Seydlitz and the British battlecruiser Lion badly damaged.

On 8 September 1915, the 5th and 9th Torpedo Boat Flotillas were on patrol north west of the Horns Reef when G12 suffered a steering failure and rammed V1. Two of V1's torpedoes exploded, wrecking V1's bow and sinking G12, killing 47 of G12's crew and 35 of V1's. V1 was towed back to Wilhelmshaven.

== Bibliography ==
- Fock, Harald (1989). Z-Vor! Internationale Entwicklung und Kriegseinsätze von Zerstörern und Torpedobooten 1914 bis 1939 (in German). Herford, Germany: Koehlers Verlagsgesellschaft mBH. ISBN 3-7822-0207-4.
- Gardiner, Robert; Gray, Randal, eds. (1985). Conway's All The World's Fighting Ships 1906–1921. London: Conway Maritime Press. ISBN 0-85177-245-5.
- Gröner, Erich; Jung, Dieter; Maass, Martin (1983). Die deutschen Kriegsschiffe 1815–1945: Band 2: Torpedoboote, Zerstörer, Schnellboote, Minensuchboote, Minenräumboote (in German). Koblenz: Bernard & Graef Verlag. ISBN 3-7637-4801-6.
- Groos, O. (1923). Der Krieg in der Nordsee: Dritter Band: Von Ende November 1914 bis Unfang Februar 1915. Der Krieg zur See: 1914–1918. Berlin: Verlag von E. S. Mittler und Sohn – via National Library of Estonia.
- Groos, O. (1924). Der Krieg in der Nordsee: Vierter Band: Von Unfang Februar bis Dezember 1915. Der Krieg zur See: 1914–1918. Berlin: Verlag von E. S. Mittler und Sohn – via National Library of Estonia.
- Massie, Robert K. (2007). Castles of Steel: Britain, Germany and the Winning of the Great War at Sea. London: Vintage Books. ISBN 978-0-099-52378-9.
- Monograph No. 11: Heligoland Bight—The Action of August 28, 1914 (PDF). Naval Staff Monographs (Historical). Vol. III. The Naval Staff, Training and Staff Duties Division. 1921. pp. 110–166.
- Moore, John (1990). Jane's Fighting Ships of World War I. London: Studio. ISBN 1-85170-378-0.
