= German ocean-going torpedo boats and destroyers of World War I =

The German large, or ocean-going, torpedo boats and destroyers of World War I were built by the Imperial German Navy between 1899 and 1918 as part of its quest for a “High Seas” or ocean-going fleet. At the start of the First World War Germany had 132 such ships, and ordered a further 216 during the conflict, 112 of which were actually completed. Of these, 55 were lost during the war, 50 were interned on 23 November 1918 under the terms of the Armistice, and subsequently scuttled at Scapa Flow on 21 June 1919. Of the survivors, 32 were included in the post-war Germany navy (some surviving to see service as auxiliaries in the Second World War), 36 were surrendered to Allied powers in 1920, and the remainder were scrapped in 1921.

== Designation ==
Officially they were called "large torpedo-boats" (Große Torpedoboote) or "ocean-going torpedo-boats" (Hochseetorpedoboote), they were in many ways the equivalent of the contemporary destroyers in other navies (and were often referred to as such by their crews). The Imperial German Navy also had a number of vessels officially designated "destroyers" (Zerstörer), but numbered sequentially in the same series as the torpedo-boats. These were, primarily, vessels under construction for foreign navies and taken over at the outbreak of the First World War.

== Background ==
The first German Naval Law of 1898 legislated the construction of an ocean-going battle fleet by Imperial Germany. To accompany the squadrons of battleships and cruisers, the law called for the construction of flotillas of considerably larger, better armed and more seaworthy than the previous torpedo boats built by Germany. Although they were initially given numbers in the same series as the smaller torpedo-boats, they were separated in 1911, with the large torpedo boats numbered from SMS V1, and the older vessels re-numbered with a 'T-'prefix. During the next 20 years a total of 336 such vessels were ordered for the German navy; these vessels are listed in this article.

== General remarks ==
=== Programs ===
The German Navy's strength during the years prior to the outbreak of the First World War was mandated by a series of acts of the Reichstag, which prescribed the numbers of ships constituting the fleet, as well as age at which these ships should be replaced. The original 1898 Naval Law called for a force 19 Battleships (in two battle squadrons), 8 Armored Coastal Defense Vessels (forming a third battle squadron), 12 large and 30 small cruisers, supported by six flotillas of Ocean-going torpedo boats (two flotillas each for the three battle squadrons). Each flotilla consisted of 12 vessels, or 72 in total. Admiral Tirpitz, the originator of this law, called for these vessels to be large enough to cope with rough seas, but small enough to be commanded by a single officer (due to the man-power constraints of the German Navy at that time).

The 1900 Naval Law, which provided for a major expansion of the German Navy (in reaction to the growing antipathy towards Great Britain provoked by the outbreak of the Boer War) expanded the torpedo-boat force to 144 vessels, half in commission, half in reserve with 60% nucleus crews. From 1898 until 1905, torpedo boats were ordered at a rate of 6 per year.

The total number of torpedo boats remained the same under the 1906 Law, although the number in commission increased to 99, with 45 in material reserve. Older vessels were to be replaced after 12 years of service, so that the annual rate of construction increased to 12 vessels in 1906 and subsequent years.

Following the outbreak of war in August 1914, 48 new vessels of the latest design were quickly ordered. This was augmented in the following weeks by seizures of vessels and machinery under manufacture in Germany for foreign powers, resulting in the addition of 4 small and 12 extra-large torpedo boats (the later group officially being designated destroyers). More orders were placed in 1916 and later years, although the deteriorating war situation of Germany meant that only a portion of these vessels were ever completed.

=== Designations and builders ===
As was common with other naval powers, the Germany Admiralty gave broad specifications for the vessels they ordered but allowed shipbuilders considerable latitude in the detail designs, with the result that there were various minor differences between vessels, even between vessels ordered in the same year. German torpedo-boats were not given names, but were numbered in a sequential series (Note: In 1911 there was a radical departure from previous practice, when a smaller, more nimble design of torpedo-boat was introduced (the Type 1911). Because of this change, it was decided to re-start the number series; to avoid duplication of designations, the older vessels were progressively re-designated with the initial letter T.), with an initial letter to denote the builder:

Letter	Builder	Number of vessels (Note: Including cancelled vessels and vessels ordered by the German navy but sold to foreign powers before completion.)
B	Blohm & Voss, Hamburg	9
G	Germaniawerft, Kiel	58
H	Howaldtswerke, Kiel	24
S	Schichau-Werke, Elbing and Danzig	135
V	AG Vulcan, Stettin and Hamburg (Note: Nearly all of the A.G. Vulcan vessels were built at Stettin; the exceptions were V 67, V 68, V 70, V 75, V76, V77, V79, V 83, V 84 V 140 and V 141, which were constructed at Hamburg.)	109
Ww	Wilhelmshaven Imperial Shipyard	1 (Note: constructed to a Germaniawerft design.).

=== Comparison with foreign vessels ===
Germany's main naval adversary of this period was Great Britain. Generally speaking, German large torpedo-boats tended to be slightly smaller than contemporary British destroyers, with lighter gun armament but heavier torpedo armament. Germany favored a well-deck forward of the bridge, mounting torpedo tubes, with a short fo'c'sle mounting a single gun; the freeboard was kept small in order to reduce the silhouette (so that the vessel would be more difficult for an adversary to spot); these features made fighting in rough weather difficult, and in later designs the well-deck was deleted and the fo'c'sle extended. Germany was slower than Britain in adopting new propulsion technologies such as steam turbines, oil fuel and geared turbines (Note: Steam turbines and oil fuel were introduced in British destroyers with the Tribal Class of 1905; geared turbines in the R Class of 1915. Excluding experimental vessels, turbines became standard in German torpedo-boats with the 1908 program; coal fuel did not disappear until the Type 1913; geared turbines were to be introduced in the projected vessels of 1918.).

== Type 1898 ==
1898 Program

- length: 62.7 m (205 ft 9 in) water-line, 63.0 m (206 ft 8 in) over-all; beam: 7.0 m (23.0 ft); draft: 2.83 m (9 ft 3 in) deep load
- Displacement: 310 tons normal, 394 tons full
- Machinery: triple expansion engines driving two propellers, 5900 HP (4.4 MW); speed: 27 knots (50 km/h); 93 tons coal; Range : 830 nautical miles at 17 knots
- Crew: 57 men
- Weapons: three 5 cm SK L/40 (2") guns in single mountings; three 45 cm (18 in) torpedo tubes, single center-line mountings (one in well-deck forward of the bridge, two others amidships).

Vessel	Launched	Completed	Fate.
S90	26 Jul 1899	24 Oct 1899	based in the German colony of Tsingtao in 1914; On 17 Oct 1914 during the Siege of Tsingtao, she sortied and sank the cruiser IJNS Takachiho, but, unable to escape the Allied blockade after running aground, she was scuttled, c. 35 nautical miles south-west of Tsingtao (35°32′N 119°36′E).
S91	25 Sep 1899	24 Apr 1900	served overseas 1900–02; renamed T 91 (4 Sep 1914); served as a coastal defense vessel, and then as a tender (from 1915); stricken from list, 22 Mar 1921; sold 26 May 1921 and scrapped, Düsseldorf.
S92	15 May 1900	27 Jun 1900	served overseas 1900–02; renamed T 92 (4 Sep 1914); mine-sweeping and escort vessel, 1914–18; stricken from list, 22 Mar 1921; sold 26 May 1921 and scrapped, Düsseldorf.
S93	24 Mar 1900	14 Jul 1900	renamed T 93 (4 Sep 1914); coastal defense and escort vessel, 1914–18; stricken from list, 22 Mar 1921; sold 26 May 1921 and scrapped, Düsseldorf.
S94	23 Apr 1900	27 Jul 1900	renamed T 94 (4 Sep 1914); coastal defense and tender, 1914–18; sunk, 13 Mar 1920 at Wilhelmshaven during the Kapp Putsch; raised, stricken 26 Oct 1920; sold 13 May 1921 and scrapped, Wilhelmshaven.
S95	20 Feb 1900	29 Aug 1900	renamed T 95 (4 Sep 1914); Sold 22 Mar 1921 and scrapped, Kiel, 1921.

1899 Program

Vessel	Launched	Completed	Fate.
S96	31 Jan 1900	27 Sep 1900	renamed T 96 (4 Sep 1914); Sold 22 Mar 1921 and scrapped, Düsseldorf, 1921.
S97	16 Dec 1899	28 May 1900	on completion she served as the disarmed dispatch vessel Sleipner for service with Royal yacht; following the outbreak of war, she was re-armed and renamed T 97 (4 Sep 1914); Sold 22 Mar 1921 and scrapped, Düsseldorf, 1921.
S98	28 Jul 1900	4 Nov 1900	renamed T 98 (4 Sep 1914); Sold 22 Mar 1921 and scrapped, Düsseldorf, 1921.
S99	4 Sep 1900	13 Dec 1900	renamed T 99 (4 Sep 1914); Sold 22 Mar 1921 and scrapped, Düsseldorf, 1921.
S100	13 Nov 1900	18 Apr 1901	renamed T 100 (4 Sep 1914); training vessel; sunk 15 Oct 1915 in collision with ferry Preußen c. 5 miles south-east of Sassnitz, Baltic Sea (54°30′N 13°43′E) (39 killed); wreck was blown up and raised, 1925–26.
S101	22 Dec 1900	30 Apr 1901	renamed T 101 (4 Sep 1914); Sold 22 Mar 1921 and scrapped, Kiel, 1921.

1900 Program

Vessel	Launched	Completed	Fate.
S102	18 Apr 1901	18 Jul 1901	renamed T 102 (4 Sep 1914); Sold 22 Mar 1921 and scrapped, Kiel, 1921.
S103	15 May 1901	17 Sep 1901	renamed T 103 (4 Sep 1914); Sold 22 Mar 1921 and scrapped, Düsseldorf, 1921.
S104	22 Jun 1901	7 Oct 1901	renamed T 104 (4 Sep 1914); Sold 22 Mar 1921 and scrapped, Düsseldorf, 1921.
S105	7 Aug 1901	17 Nov 1901	renamed T 105 (4 Sep 1914); Sold 22 Mar 1921 and scrapped, Düsseldorf, 1921.
S106	7 Sep 1901	9 Dec 1901	renamed T 106 (4 Sep 1914); Sold 22 Mar 1921 and scrapped, Düsseldorf, 1921.
S107	17 Oct 1901	27 Jan 1902	renamed T 107 (4 Sep 1914); Sold 22 Mar 1921 and scrapped, Kiel, 1921.

1901 Program

Vessel	Launched	Completed	Fate.
G108	7 Sep 1901	26 Mar 1902	renamed T 108 (4 Sep 1914); Sold 22 Mar 1921 and scrapped, Hamburg, 1921.
G109	9 Nov 1901	19 Jun 1902	renamed T 109 (4 Sep 1914); Sold 22 Mar 1921 and scrapped, Kiel, 1921.
G110	9 Sep 1902	21 Jan 1903	renamed T 110 (4 Sep 1914); Sold 22 Mar 1921 and scrapped, Hamburg.
G111	2 Apr 1902	21 Jul 1902	renamed T 111 (4 Sep 1914); Sold 22 Mar 1920 and scrapped, Kiel, 1921.
G112	19 Jun 1902	6 Sep 1902	renamed T 111 (4 Sep 1914); Sold 22 Mar 1920 and scrapped, Kiel, 1921.
G113	9 Aug 1902	16 Oct 1902	renamed T 113 (4 Sep 1914); sold 22 Mar 1921 and scrapped, Wilhelmshaven, 1921.

1902 Program

Vessel	Launched	Completed	Fate.
S114	9 Aug 1902	25 Oct 1902	renamed T 114 (27 Sep 1916); Sold 9 Nov 1920 and scrapped, Kiel, 1921.
S115	10 Sep 1902	22 Feb 1903	Sunk 17 Oct 1914 in action c. 50 miles SW of Texel Island, North Sea (52°48′N 3°49′E) by light cruiser HMS Undaunted and the destroyers HMS Lennox, HMS Lance, HMS Loyal and HMS Legion (55 killed).
S116	14 Oct 1902	28 Mar 1903	Torpedoed and sunk, 6 Oct 1914, c. 10 miles north of Schiermonnikoog, North Sea (53°42′N 6°9′E) by the British submarine E 9 (9 killed).
S117	4 Feb 1903	21 May 1903	Sunk 17 Oct 1914 with S115, in 52°48′N 3°53′E (64 killed).
S118	21 Mar 1903	9 Jul 1903	Sunk 17 Oct 1914 with S 115, in 52°50′N 3°49′E (52 killed).
S119	8 Jul 1903	6 Sep 1903	Sunk 17 Oct 1914 with S115, in 52°50′N 3°53′E (47 killed); code books subsequently recovered by Royal Navy Intelligence.

1903 Program

Vessel	Launched	Completed	Fate.
S120	10 Feb 1904	7 May 1904	renamed T 120 (27 Sep 1916); sold 22 Mar 1921 and scrapped, Wilhelmshaven, 1921.
S121	3 Mar 1904	17 Jun 1904	renamed T 121 (27 Sep 1916); Sold 22 Mar 1920 and scrapped, Kiel, 1921.
S122	23 Apr 1904	5 Aug 1904	mined and sunk 5 Oct 1918 c. 50 miles north of Ameland, North Sea (54°40′N 5°57′E) (12 killed).
S123	25 Jun 1904	23 Aug 1904	mined and sunk 1 May 1916 northern end of Sylt Island, North Sea (55°4′N 8°23′E) (23 killed).
S124	3 Aug 1904	8 Oct 1904	sunk 30 Nov 1914 in collision with Danish S.S. Anglodane, c. 12 miles north of Rostock, Baltic (54°22′N 12°11′E) (1 killed); wreck raised and scrapped, Kiel, 1915.
S125	19 May 1904	4 Apr 1905	renamed T 125 (27 Sep 1916); sold 26 Oct 1920 and scrapped, Hamburg-Moorburg.

1904 Program

Vessel	Launched	Completed	Fate.
S126	26 Nov 1904	30 Apr 1905	sunk in collision with SMS Undine, 17 Nov 1905 (33 killed); raised 1906 and returned to service, 1908; renamed T 126 (27 Sep 1916); Sold 22 Mar 1920 and scrapped, Kiel, 1921.
S127	12 Jan 1905	7 Jun 1905	renamed T 120 (27 Sep 1916); sold 22 Mar 1921 and scrapped, Wilhelmshaven, 1921.
S128	25 Feb 1905	8 Jul 1905	renamed T 128 (27 Sep 1916); Sold 22 Mar 1920 and scrapped, Kiel, 1921.
S129	4 Mar 1905	10 Aug 1905	wrecked 5 Nov 1915 c. 3 miles north-west of Nigehörn Island, North Sea (53°59′N 8°21′E) (0 killed).
S130	27 Apr 1905	17 Sep 1905	renamed T 130 (27 Sep 1916); sold 22 Mar 1921 and scrapped, Wilhelmshaven, 1921.
S131	25 May 1905	6 Oct 1905	renamed T 131 (27 Sep 1916); sold 22 Mar 1921 and scrapped, Wilhelmshaven, 1921.

1905 Program

Vessel	Launched	Completed	Fate.
G132	12 May 1906	22 Aug 1906	renamed T 132 (27 Sep 1916); sold 22 Mar 1921 and scrapped, Wilhelmshaven, 1921.
G133	30 Jun 1906	10 Dec 1906	renamed T 133 (27 Sep 1916); sold 22 Mar 1921 and scrapped, Wilhelmshaven, 1921.
G134	23 Jul 1906	6 Mar 1907	renamed T 134 (27 Sep 1916); sold 9 Nov 1920 and scrapped Hamburg, 1920.
G135	7 Sep 1906	24 Jan 1906	renamed T 135 (27 Sep 1916); sold 25 May 1921 and scrapped, Wilhelmshaven, 1921.
G136	25 Aug 1906	16 Mar 1907	renamed T 136 (27 Sep 1916); sold 21 Jul 1921 and scrapped, Wilhelmshaven, 1921.
G137	24 Jan 1907	24 Jul 1907	renamed T 137 (27 Sep 1916); sold 22 Mar 1921 and scrapped, Wilhelmshaven, 1921.

== Type 1906 ==
1906 Program (II Flotilla)

Vessel	Launched	Completed	Fate.
S138	22 Sep 1906	7 May 1907	renamed T 138 (24 Sep 1917); mined and sunk, c. 50 miles north-west of Terschelling, North Sea (54°26′N 4°32′E), 0106 hrs, 7 Jul 1918 (32 killed).
S139	12 Nov 1906	6 Jul 1907	renamed T 139 (24 Sep 1917); to Reichsmarine, 1919; removed from active service 3 Aug 1927; converted to remote control vessel Pfeil, 1927; still in use, 1944; ultimate fate unknown, presumably scrapped post-1945.
S140	22 Dec 1906	3 Aug 1907	renamed T 140 (24 Sep 1917); sold for scrap, 22 Mar 1921.
S141	7 Feb 1907	9 Sep 1907	renamed T 141 (24 Sep 1917); to Reichsmarine, 1919; removed from active service 3 Aug 1927; converted to target vessel Blitz, 1927; sold for scrap, 1933.
S142	6 Mar 1907	20 Sep 1907	renamed T 142 (24 Sep 1917); training and escort vessel; sold for scrap, 2 Dec 1920.
S143	6 Apr 1907	12 Oct 1907	sunk 1700 hrs 3 Aug 1914 following a boiler explosion, c. 30 miles north of Rostock, Baltic (54°30′N 12°06′E) (24 killed); raised and repaired; renamed T 143 (24 Sep 1917); to Reichsmarine, 1919; stricken from Navy list, 10 May 1927; sold 25 Mar 30 and scrapped, Hamburg.
S144	27 Apr 1907	3 Dec 1907	renamed T 144 (24 Sep 1917); Tender, 1918; to Reichsmarine, 1919; sold for scrap 8 Oct 1928.
S145	8 Jun 1907	17 Dec 1907	renamed T 145 (24 Sep 1917); sold for scrap 22 Mar 1921.
S146	27 Jun 1907	20 Nov 1907	renamed T 146 (24 Sep 1917); training vessel; to Reichsmarine, 1919; sold for scrap 8 Oct 1928.
S147	3 Aug 1907	10 Apr 1908	renamed T 147 (24 Sep 1917); escort vessel; sold for scrap, 2 Dec 1920.
S148	11 Sep 1907	18 Mar 1908	renamed T 148 (24 Sep 1917); to Reichsmarine, 1919; removed from Navy List 8 Oct 1928; scrapped, Wilhelmshaven, 1935.
S149	19 Oct 1907	27 Jul 1908	renamed T 149 (24 Sep 1917); to Reichsmarine, 1919; removed from Navy list, 16 May 1927; scrapped.

1907 Program (VI Flotilla)

Vessel	Launched	Completed	Fate.
V150	1 Aug 1907	20 Nov 1907	sunk in collision with V 157, 0020 hrs, 18 May 1915 in the Jade in 54°24′N 7°45′E (60 killed).
V151	14 Sep 1907	29 Feb 1908	renamed T 151 (24 Sep 1917); to Reichsmarine, 1919; target tug Comet, 1937; escort vessel, 1939; Mine clearance service, 1945; transferred to USA, 4 Jan 1946; scrapped, Bremen 1948.
V152	11 Oct 1907	10 Apr 1908	renamed T 152 (24 Sep 1917); to Reichsmarine, 1919; sold 31 Mar 1931; scrapped, 1935.
V153	13 Nov 1907	9 May 1908	renamed T 153 (24 Sep 1917); to Reichsmarine, 1919; training ship Eduard Jungmann, 1938; transferred to USA, 22 Dec 1945; Mine clearance service until 1947; scrapped, 1949.
V154	19 Dec 1907	5 Jun 1908	renamed T 154 (24 Sep 1917); to Reichsmarine, 1919; sold 8 Oct 1928; scrapped, 1935.
V155	28 Jan 1908	25 Jun 1908	renamed T 155 (24 Sep 1917); to Reichsmarine, 1919; tender and escort vessel, 1936; sunk, Swinemünde, 22 Apr 1945 in 53°56′N 14°17′E; later scrapped.
V156	29 Feb 1908	21 Jul 1908	training vessel; renamed T 156 (24 Sep 1917); to Reichsmarine, 1919; escort vessel, 1936; renamed Bremse, in Norway, 1944; sunk, 3 May 1945, Kiel; later scrapped.
V157	29 May 1908	27 Aug 1908	renamed T 157 (24 Sep 1917); to Reichsmarine, 1919; escort vessel, 1936; mined and sunk, 17.25 hrs, 22 Oct 1943 at Neufahrwasser, Danzig in 54°25′N 18°43′E. raised and scrapped.
V158	23 Jun 1908	8 Oct 1908	renamed T 158 (24 Sep 1917); to Reichsmarine, 1919; escort vessel, 1936; to USSR, as Prozorlivyj, 15 Jan 1946; scrapped. 1950.
V159	18 Jul 1908	2 Nov 1908	renamed T 159 (24 Sep 1917); to UK, 20 Aug 1920; scrapped, Granton, Edinburgh, 1922.
V160	12 Sep 1908	15 Dec 1908	renamed T 160 (24 Sep 1917); to UK, 20 Aug 1920; scrapped, Granton, 1922.
V161	21 Apr 1908	17 Sep 1908	renamed T 161 (24 Sep 1917); to UK, 3 Sep 1920; scrapped Bo'ness, 1922.

1908 Program (III Flotilla)

Vessel	Launched	Completed	Fate.
V162	9 May 1909	28 May 1909	coastal defence; mined and sunk, Baltic, 22.30 hrs, 15 Aug 1916 in 57°35′N 21°35′E (15 killed).
V163	24 May 1909	22 Jul 1909	training vessel; renamed T 163 (24 Sep 1917); to UK, 3 Sep 1920; scrapped, Dordrecht, 1921.
V164	27 May 1909	20 Aug 1909	renamed T 164 (24 Sep 1917); to UK, 5 Aug 1920; scrapped, Bo'ness, 1922.
S165(i)	20 Mar 1909	-	sold to Turkey, 1910 as Muavenet-i Milliye; laid up 1918; scrapped, 1953.
S166(i)	24 Apr 1909	-	sold to Turkey, 1910 as Yadigar-i Millet; sunk by British bombing attack, Bosporus, 10 Jul 1917 in 39°56′N 29°10′E (29 killed): raised Oct 1917; scrapped 1924.
S167(i)	3 Jul 1909	-	sold to Turkey, 1910 as Numune-i Hamiyet, laid up, 1919; scrapped, 1923.
S168(i)	30 Sep 1909	-	sold to Turkey, 1910 as Gayret-i Vataniye; wrecked, 28 Oct 1916 off Balchik in the Black Sea.
G169	29 Dec 1908	29 Apr 1909	renamed T 169 (24 Sep 1917); to UK, 5 Aug 1920; scrapped, Dordrecht, 1922.
G170	7 Nov 1909	30 Apr 1909	renamed T 170 (24 Sep 1917); sold 22 Mar 1921 and scrapped, Wilhelmshaven, 1921.
G171	28 May 1909	4 Jan 1910	sunk in collision with SMS Zähringen in 54°10′N 8°5′E, 14 Sep 1912 (7 killed); wreck blown up, 1912.
G172	10 Jul 1909	4 Jan 1910	renamed T 172 (24 Sep 1917); mined and sunk 04.28 hrs, 7 Jul 1918, North Sea in 54°26′N 4°35′E (16 killed).
G173	28 Jul 1909	24 Jan 1910	renamed T 173 (24 Sep 1917); to UK, 3 Sep 1920; scrapped, Montrose, 1922.

1909 Program (VIII Flotilla)

Vessel	Launched	Completed	Fate.
G174	8 Jan 1910	6 Jul 1910	renamed T 174 (22 Feb 1918); to UK, 5 Aug 1920; scrapped, Granton, 1922.
G175	24 Feb 1910	4 Dec 1910	temporarily renamed Sleipner for two months in 1912 while serving as a despatch boat; renamed T 175 (24 Sep 1917); to Reichsmarine, 1919; deleted from list and sold (for 63 000 ℛℳ), 23 Sep 1926; scrapped, Hamburg.
S176	12 Apr 1910	23 Sep 1910	renamed T 176 (22 Feb 1918); to UK, 15 Sep 1920; scrapped, Montrose, 1922.
S177	21 May 1910	16 Feb 1911	mined and sunk, Baltic, 09.46 hrs 23 Dec 1915 in 57°30′N 21°27′E (7 killed).
S178	14 Jul 1910	9 Dec 1910	sunk in collision with SMS Yorck, 4 Mar 1913 (69 killed); wreck raised in two parts and repaired, 1915; renamed T 178 (22 Feb 1918); to UK, 5 Aug 1920; scrapped, Dordrecht, 1922.
S179	27 Aug 1910	8 Mar 1911	renamed T 179 (22 Feb 1918); to UK, 5 Aug 1920; scrapped, Dordrecht, 1922.
V180	15 Oct 1909	4 Jan 1910	renamed T 179 (22 Feb 1918); to Brazil, 5 Aug 1920; scrapped, Dordrecht, 1921.
V181	6 Nov 1909	11 Mar 1910	renamed T 181 (22 Feb 1918); to Japan, 20 Aug 1920; scrapped, Dordrecht, 1922.
V182	1 Dec 1909	4 May 1910	renamed T 182 (22 Feb 1918); to UK, 5 Aug 1920; scrapped, Dordrecht, 1922.
V183	23 Dec 1909	12 May 1910	renamed T 183 (22 Feb 1918); to UK, 5 Aug 1920; scrapped, Dordrecht, 1922.
V184	26 Feb 1910	29 Jun 1910	renamed T 184 (22 Feb 1918); to UK, 5 Aug 1920; scrapped, Dordrecht, 1922.
V185	9 Apr 1910	20 Sep 1910	renamed T 185 (22 Feb 1918); to Reichsmarine, 1919; deleted, 4 Oct 1932; used as target vessel; to USSR as Vystrel, 1945.

1910 Program (I Flotilla)

Vessel	Launched	Completed	Fate.
V186	28 Nov 1910	21 Apr 1911	renamed T 186 (22 Feb 1918); to UK, 5 Aug 1920; scrapped, Dordrecht, 1922.
V187	11 Jan 1911	4 May 1911	sunk by gunfire of British cruisers and destroyers, Battle of Heligoland Bight in 52°8′N 7°31′E, 10.00 hrs 28 Aug 1914 (24 killed).
V188	8 Feb 1911	20 May 1911	Torpedoed and sunk by British submarine E-16, North Sea in 54°16′N 5°35′E, 14.00 hrs 26 Jul 1915 (5 killed).
V189	14 Mar 1911	30 Jun 1911	renamed T 189 (22 Feb 1918); transferred to UK at Cherbourg, 28 Apr 1920; stranded on British south coast, Dec 1920; scrapped, Chatham, 1922.
V190	12 Apr 1911	5 Aug 1911	renamed T 190 (22 Feb 1918); to Reichsmarine, 1919; pilot boat Claus von Bevern, 29 Aug 1938; to USA 1945; scuttled in Skagerrak, 1946.
V191	2 Jun 1911	28 Sep 1911	mined and sunk, 17.45 hrs 17 Dec 1915 in Baltic in 57°30′N 21°34′E (25 killed).
G192	5 Nov 1910	8 May 1911	renamed T 192 (22 Feb 1918); transferred to UK at Cherbourg 28 Apr 1920; scrapped, Chatham, 1922.
G193	10 Dec 1910	25 Jun 1911	renamed T 193 (22 Feb 1918); transferred to UK at Cherbourg, 28 Apr 1920; scrapped, Chatham, 1922.
G194	12 Jan 1911	2 Aug 1911	rammed and sunk in the North Sea by HMS Cleopatra in 55°33′N 6°5′E, 26 Mar 1916 (93 killed).
G195	8 Apr 1911	8 Sep 1911	renamed T 195 (22 Feb 1918); transferred to UK at Cherbourg, 28 Apr 1920; scrapped, Chatham, 1922.
G196	24 May 1911	2 Oct 1911	renamed T 196 (22 Feb 1918); to Reichsmarine, 1919; training vessel; minesweeper HQ vessel, 1939; to USSR, 27 Dec 1945; renamed Pronzitelnyj in Soviet service; later scrapped.
G197	23 Jun 1911	10 Nov 1911	renamed T 197 (22 Feb 1918); transferred to UK at Cherbourg, 28 Apr 1920; scrapped, Briton Ferry, 1921.

1910 supplementary order Replacements for the four vessels sold to Turkey in 1910.

Vessel	Launched	Completed	Fate.
S165(ii)	26 Nov 1910	27 Apr 1911	renamed T 165 (24 Sep 1917); to UK, 15 Sep 1920; scrapped, Montrose, 1922.
S166(ii)	27 Dec 1910	7 Jul 1911	renamed T 166 (24 Sep 1917); to UK, 5 Aug 1920; scrapped, Dordrecht, 1922.
S167(ii)	15 Feb 1911	26 Aug 1911	renamed T 167 (24 Sep 1917); sold, 22 Mar 1921; scrapped Kiel.
S168(ii)	16 Mar 1911	1 Jul 1911	renamed T 168 (24 Sep 1917); to Reichsmarine, 1919; deleted from the fleet list, 1927 and sold, 8 Jan 1927; scrapped, Hamburg.

== Type 1911 ==
1911 Program (V Flotilla) On completion, these vessels formed the V Torpedo Boat Flotilla of the High Seas Fleet.

Vessel	Launched	Completed	Fate.
V1	11 Sep 1911	12 Jan 1912	to Reichsmarine, 1919; stricken from the Fleet list, 27 Mar 1929; scrapped, Wilhelmshaven.
V2	14 Oct 1911	28 Mar 1912	to Reichsmarine, 1919; stricken from the Fleet list, 18 Nov 1929; scrapped, Wilhelmshaven.
V3	15 Nov 1911	2 May 1912	to Reichsmarine, 1919; stricken from the Fleet list, 18 Nov 1929; scrapped, Wilhelmshaven.
V4	23 Dec 1911	15 Jun 1912	sunk 03.20 hrs, 1 Jun 1916 during the Battle of Jutland 55°36′N 6°37′E (18 killed).
V5(i)	22 May 1912	-	Sold to Greece, Jul 1912 as Keravnos; laid up 1919 and scrapped, 1921.
V6(i)	29 Feb 1912	-	Sold to Greece, Jul 1912 as Nea Genea; laid up 1919 and scrapped, 1921.
G7	7 Nov 1911	30 Apr 1912	to Reichsmarine, 1919; Training vessel, 1936; re-designated T 107, 23 Apr 1939; to USSR, 1945 as Poražajuščij, later hulked; scrapped, 1957.
G8	21 Dec 1911	6 Aug 1912	to Reichsmarine, 1919; Training vessel, 1936; re-designated T 108, 23 Apr 1939; to UK, 6 Jan 1946; scrapped 1946.
G9	31 Jan 1912	25 Sep 1912	mined and sunk 04.15 hrs 3 May 1918 in 55°14′N 6°19′E (31 killed).
G10	15 Mar 1912	28 Aug 1912	to Reichsmarine, 1919; Training vessel, 1936; re-designated T 110, 23 Apr 1939; sunk, 5 May 1945 in the River Trave, Lübeck.
G11	23 Apr 1912	8 Aug 1912	to Reichsmarine, 1919; Training vessel, 1936; re-designated T 111, 23 Apr 1939; bombed and sunk, 3 Apr 1945 in Scheerhafen, Kiel.
G12	15 Jul 1912	17 Oct 1912	damaged in collision with V1, 06.00 hrs 8 Sep 1915 in 55°25′N 7°28′E and sunk following a torpedo explosion (47 killed).

1912 Program (VII Flotilla) On completion, these vessels formed the VII Torpedo Boat Flotilla of the High Seas Fleet.

Vessel	Launched	Completed	Fate.
S13	7 Dec 1911	2 Jul 1912	sunk 08.56 hrs 6 Nov 1914 in 54°0′N 8°22′E following a torpedo explosion (9 killed).
S14	2 Mar 1912	1 Nov 1912	sunk by internal explosion, 19 Feb 1915 in the Jade in53°40′N 8°5′E (11 killed); raised, 1915 and scrapped, Wilhelmshaven.
S15	23 Mar 1912	1 Nov 1912	mined 21 Aug 1917 in the English Channel in 51°15′N 2°55′E; removed from service as beyond repair, 20 Sep 1917 and scrapped, Ghent.
S16	20 Apr 1912	1 Oct 1912	mined and sunk 18.15 hrs, 20 Jan 1918 in 54°41′N 2°55′E (80 killed).
S17	22 Jun 1912	7 Dec 1912	mined and sunk 16 May 1917 in 53°34′N 5°56′E (25 killed).
S18	10 Aug 1912	12 Jan 1913	to Reichsmarine, 1919; collided with battleship Hannover off Rugen, 23 May 1922 (10 killed); repaired; stricken from Fleet list, 1929; sold 31 Mar 1931 and scrapped, Kiel, 1935.
S19	17 Oct 1912	29 Mar 1913	to Reichsmarine, 1919; stricken from Fleet list, 1929; sold 31 Mar 1931; scrapped, Kiel, 1935.
S20	4 Dec 1912	1 Nov 1913	sunk in action with HMS Centaur, 04.00 hrs 5 Jun 1917 off Flanders Coast in 51°28′N 2°48′E (49 killed).
S21	11 Jan 1913	20 Jun 1913	rammed and sunk by SMS Hamburg 21 Apr 1915 in 53°47′N 08°09′E (36 killed).
S22	15 Feb 1913	23 Jul 1913	mined and sunk 21.35 hrs 26 Mar 1916 in 53°46′N 5°4′E (76 killed).
S23	29 Mar 1913	1 Nov 1913	to Reichsmarine, 1919; renumbered T 123 16 Mar 1932; renamed Komet, 23 Apr 1939; control vessel for radio-controlled target vessel Hessen; the fate since November 1944 is unknown.
S24	28 Jun 1913	27 Aug 1913	surrendered to the UK at Cherbourg, 28 Apr 1920; stranded on the south coast, 1920; later scrapped.

1912 Supplementary order Replacements for the two vessels sold to Greece in 1912.

Vessel	Launched	Completed	Fate.
V5 (ii)	25 Apr 1913	17 Jul 1913	to Reichsmarine, 1919; deleted from Fleet list, 18 Nov 1929; scrapped, Wilhelmshaven.
V6 (ii)	28 Feb 1913;	17 May 1913	to Reichsmarine, 1919; deleted from Fleet list, 27 Mar 1929; scrapped, Wilhelmshaven

== Type 1913 ==
1913 Program (IX Flotilla) Ordered 1 Apr 1913. On completion, most of these vessels joined the IX Torpedo Boat Flotilla of the High Seas Fleet.

Vessel	Launched	Completed	Fate.
V25	29 Jan 1914	27 Jun 1914	mined and sunk 04.00 hrs 13 Feb 1915 in 54°22′N 7°47′E (79 killed).
V26	21 Feb 1914	1 Aug 1914	surrendered to UK at Cherbourg, 13 Feb 1920; scrapped, Portishead 1922.
V27	26 Mar 1914	2 Sep 1914	sunk during the Battle of Jutland, 17.40 hrs 31 May 1916 in 56°24.3′N 5°54′E (0 killed).
V28	9 May 1914	22 Sep 1914	surrendered to UK at Cherbourg, 13 Feb 1920; scrapped, Portishead 1922.
V29	18 Aug 1914	19 Oct 1914	sunk by torpedo hit from HMS Petard during the Battle of Jutland, 17.45 hrs 31 May 1916 in 56°43′N 5°57′E (37 killed).
V30	18 Sep 1914	16 Nov 1914	mined and sunk 20 Nov 1918 in 54°45′N 6°15′E, while en route to the surrender of the High Seas Fleet (2 killed).
S31	20 Dec 1913	9 Aug 1914	mined and sunk 23.00 hrs 19 Aug 1915 in 57°23′N 23°5′E during the assault into the Gulf of Riga (11 killed).
S32	28 Feb 1914	10 Sep 1914	Interned, Scapa Flow, 22 Nov 1918; scuttled 21 Jun 1919; raised 19 Jun 1925 and scrapped, Granton.
S33	4 Apr 1914	4 Oct 1914	torpedoed and sunk by British submarine L 10 11.43 hrs 3 Oct 1918, North Sea in 54°44′N 5°15′E (5 killed).
S34	13 Jun 1914	5 Nov 1914	mined and sunk 03.05 hrs 3 Oct 1918, North Sea in 54°45′N 5°43′E (70 killed).
S35	30 Aug 1914	4 Dec 1914	Sold to Greece Apr 1914, but seized 10 Aug 1914; sunk 20.00 hrs 31 May 1916 during the Battle of Jutland in 56°56′N 6°4′E (87 killed, including 4 survivors of V 29).
S36	17 Oct 1914	4 Jan 1915	Sold to Greece Apr 1914, but seized 10 Aug 1914; Interned, Scapa Flow, 22 Nov 1918; scuttled 21 Jun 1919; raised 18 Apr 1925 and scrapped.

1914 Program (VI Flotilla) The last pre-war Flotilla, ordered 22 Apr 1914. On completion, most of these vessels joined the VI Torpedo Boat Flotilla of the High Seas Fleet, (replacing V 151-V 161).

Vessel	Launched	Completed	Fate.
G37	17 Dec 1914	2 Jul 1915	mined and sunk 04.55 hrs 4 Nov 1917 in 54°19′N 4°55′E (4 killed).
G38	23 Dec 1914	30 Jul 1915	Interned, Scapa Flow, 22 Nov 1918; scuttled 21 Jun 1919.
G39	16 Jan 1915	20 Aug 1915	Interned, Scapa Flow, 22 Nov 1918; scuttled 21 Jun 1919.
G40	27 Feb 1915	16 Sep 1915	Interned, Scapa Flow, 22 Nov 1918; scuttled 21 Jun 1919.
G41	24 Apr 1915	14 Oct 1915	heavily damaged in collision with V 69 during the action off the North Hinder, 22-23 Jan 1917; laid up in Bruges, and scuttled there on 3 Oct 1918 in 51°13′N 3°14′E, as she was unable to be evacuated.
G42	20 May 1915	10 Nov 1915	sunk in action with HMS Broke, 2nd Battle of Dover Strait 21 Apr 1917 in 51°9′N 1°37′E (36 killed).
V43	27 Jan 1915	28 May 1915	Interned, Scapa Flow, 22 Nov 1918; attempted scuttling on 21 Jun 1919 failed and ship recovered; to USA, 1920; sunk as air bombing target off Cape Henry, 15 Jul 1921.
V44	24 Feb 1915	22 Jul 1915	Interned, Scapa Flow, 22 Nov 1918; attempted scuttling on 21 Jun 1919 failed and ship recovered; to UK, 1920; after use as gunnery target, beached off Whale Island, Portsmouth Harbour 50°48′49″N 1°05′43″W, and partially scrapped, c. 1922 (remains still visible in Portsmouth harbour at low tide, 2016).
V45	29 Mar 1915	30 Sep 1915	Interned, Scapa Flow, 22 Nov 1918; scuttled 21 Jun 1919.
V46	23 Dec 1914	31 Oct 1915	Interned, Scapa Flow, 22 Nov 1918; attempted scuttling on 21 Jun 1919 failed and ship recovered; to France, 1920; scrapped Cherbourg, 1924.
V47	10 Jun 1915	20 Nov 1915	non-seaworthy, unable to evacuate and scuttled 2 Nov 1918, Ghent–Terneuzen Canal in 51°14′N 3°51′E.
V48	6 Aug 1915	10 Dec 1915	sunk, 21.50 hrs, 31 May 1916, during the Battle of Jutland, in 57°1′N 6°0′E (87 killed)

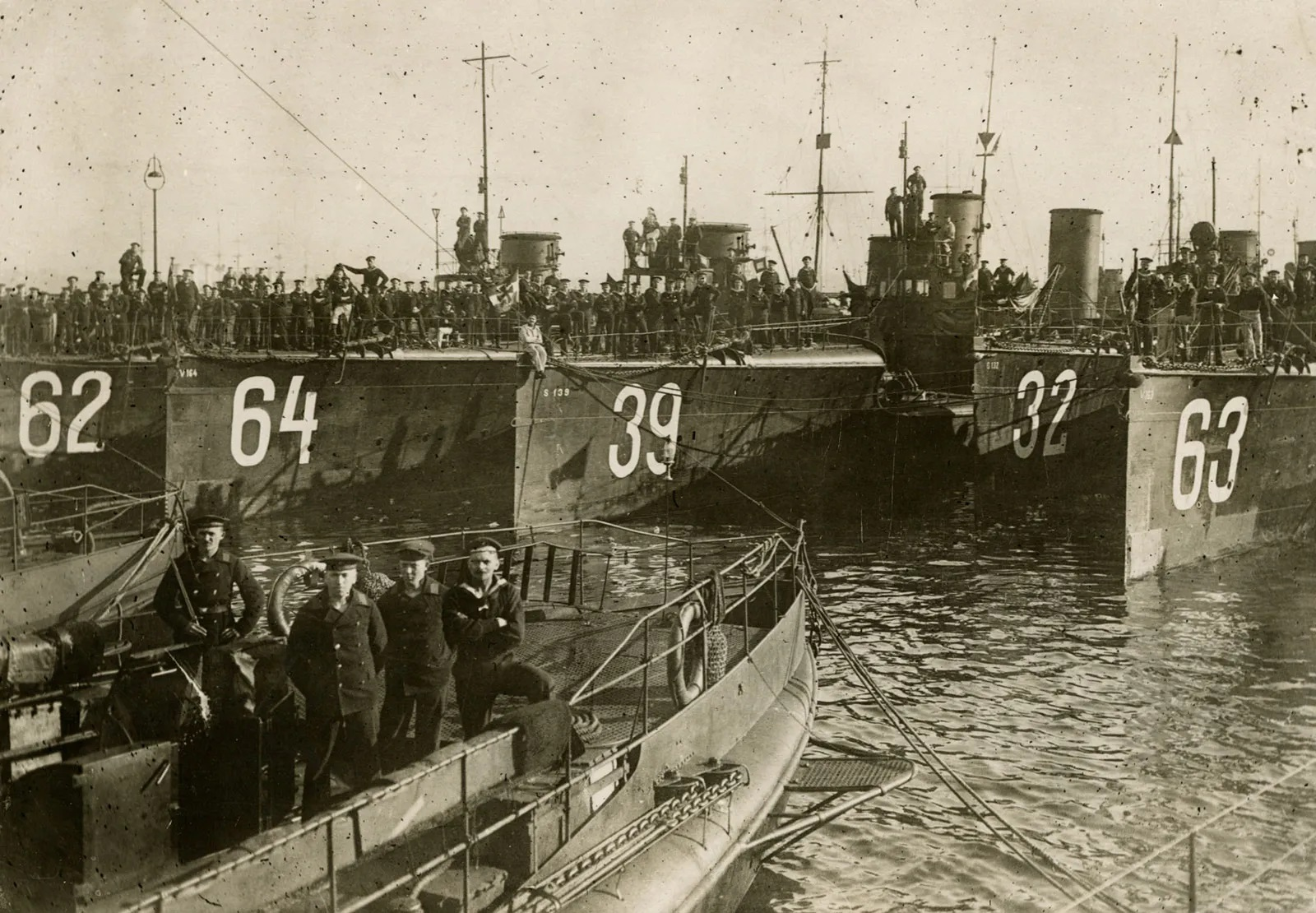
Imperial German Navy Torpedo Boats in 1915

Mobilization Program

48 vessels ordered 6 Aug 1914 as part of the mobilization of the German armed forces for the First World War. The first two, S 49 and S 50 had been originally projected as replacements for S35 and S 36, which were sold to Greece in April 1914.

Vessel	Launched	Completed	Fate.
S49	10 Apr 1915	12 Jul 1915	Interned, Scapa Flow, 22 Nov 1918; scuttled 21 Jun 1919.
S50	24 Apr 1915	15 Aug 1915	Interned, Scapa Flow, 22 Nov 1918; scuttled 21 Jun 1919.
S51	29 Apr 1915	7 Sep 1915	Interned, Scapa Flow, 22 Nov 1918; beached while attempting to scuttle, 21 Jun 1919; raised Jul 1919; to UK, 1920; scrapped, Rosyth, 1922.
S52	12 Jun 1915	28 Sep 1915	Interned, Scapa Flow, 22 Nov 1918; scuttled 21 Jun 1919.
S53	18 Sep 1915	17 Dec 1915	Interned, Scapa Flow, 22 Nov 1918; scuttled 21 Jun 1919.
S54	11 Oct 1915	30 Jan 1916	Interned, Scapa Flow, 22 Nov 1918; beached while attempting to scuttle, 21 Jun 1919; to UK, 1920; scrapped Rosyth, 1922.
S55	6 Nov 1915	6 Mar 1916	Interned, Scapa Flow, 22 Nov 1918; scuttled 21 Jun 1919.
S56	11 Dec 1915	16 Apr 1916	Interned, Scapa Flow, 22 Nov 1918; scuttled 21 Jun 1919.
S57	8 Jan 1916	5 May 1916	mined and sunk 22.18 hrs 10 Nov 1916, Gulf of Finland 59°21′N 22°29′E (2 killed).
S58	5 Feb 1916	4 Jun 1916	mined and sunk 04.25 hrs 11 Nov 1916, Gulf of Finland 59°22′N 22°48′E (0 killed).
S59	16 Feb 1916	3 Jul 1916	mined and sunk 05.48 hrs 11 Nov 1916, Gulf of Finland 59°21′N 22°45′E (0 killed).
S60	3 Apr 1916	15 Aug 1916	Interned, Scapa Flow, 22 Nov 1918; beached while attempting to scuttle, 21 Jun 1919; to Japan, 1920; scrapped 1920.
S61	8 Apr 1916	20 Sep 1916	scuttled, Ghent–Terneuzen Canal, 2 Oct 1918 in 51°14′N 3°51′E.
S62	13 May 1916	7 Nov 1916	mined and sunk 21.30 hrs 10 Jul 1918 in 54°47′N 4°52′E (27 killed).
S63	25 May 1916	18 Dec 1916	to Italy, 23 May 1920; commissioned as Ardimentoso^{(IT)}; scrapped, 1937.
S64	21 Aug 1916	15 Mar 1917	mined and sunk during the Battle of Moon Sound, 01.00 hrs 18 Oct 1917 in 58°43′N 23°14′E (6 killed).
S65	14 Oct 1916	22 Apr 1917	Interned, Scapa Flow, 22 Nov 1918; scuttled 21 Jun 1919.
S66	21 Nov 1916	9 May 1917	mined and sunk 20.40 hrs 10 Jul 1918 in 54°47′N 4°52′E (76 killed).
V67	3 Aug 1915	1 Nov 1915	built at Hamburg; scuttled, Ghent–Terneuzen Canal, 2 Oct 1918 in 51°13′N 3°55′E.
V68	24 Aug 1915	3 Dec 1915	built at Hamburg; mined and sunk 15.05 hrs 8 Aug 1918 in 51°33′N 3°15′E (18 killed).
V69	18 Aug 1915	9 Jan 1916	scuttled, Ghent, 2 Oct 1918 in 51°4′N 3°51′E.
V70	14 Oct 1915	6 Jan 1916	built at Hamburg; Interned, Scapa Flow, 22 Nov 1918; scuttled 21 Jun 1919.
V71	1 Sep 1915	10 Mar 1916	interned, Stockholm, 1918; to UK, 13 May 1920; scrapped 1921.
V72	30 Dec 1915	28 Mar 1916	mined and sunk 03.45 hrs 11 Nov 1916, Gulf of Finland 59°23′N 22°51′E (0 killed).
V73	24 Sep 1915	16 Feb 1916	Interned, Scapa Flow, 22 Nov 1918; beached while attempting to scuttle, 21 Jun 1919; scuttled 21 Jun 1919; to UK, 1920; scrapped Grangemouth 1922.
V74	29 Oct 1915	28 Mar 1916	sunk in accidental explosion while loading mines, Zeebrugge, 25 May 1918 in 51°20′N 3°12′E; raised 17 Jul 1918; scuttled, Brugge, 3 Oct 1918 in 51°13′0″N 3°14′0″E.
V75	15 Jan 1916	29 Apr 1916	built at Hamburg; mined and sunk 22.04 hrs 10 Nov 1916, Gulf of Finland 59°23′N 22°30′E (3 killed).
V76	27 Feb 1916	8 Jun 1916	built at Hamburg; mined and sunk 06.25 hrs 11 Nov 1916, Gulf of Finland 59°20′N 22°23′E (1 killed).
V77	28 Feb 1916	18 May 1916	built at Hamburg; scuttled, Ghent–Terneuzen Canal, 2 Oct 1918 in 51°13′N 3°55′E.
V78	19 Feb 1916	18 May 1916	Interned, Scapa Flow, 22 Nov 1918; scuttled 21 Jun 1919.
V79	18 Apr 1916	11 Jul 1916	built at Hamburg; to France, 14 Jun 1920; commissioned as Pierre Durand^{(FR)}; stricken from list 15 Feb 1933.
V80	28 Apr 1916	6 Jul 1916	Interned, Scapa Flow, 22 Nov 1918; beached while attempting to scuttle, 21 Jun 1919; to Japan, 1920; scrapped, 1922.
V81	27 May 1916	29 Jul 1916	Interned, Scapa Flow, 22 Nov 1918; beached while attempting to scuttle, 21 Jun 1919; to UK, 1920; scrapped.
V82	5 Jul 1916	30 Aug 1916	Interned, Scapa Flow, 22 Nov 1918; beached while attempting to scuttle, 21 Jun 1919; to UK, 1920; after use as gunnery target, beached off Whale Island, Portsmouth Harbour 50°48′49″N 1°05′41″W, and partially scrapped, c. 1922 (remains still visible in Portsmouth harbour at low tide, 2016)
V83	10 Jun 1916	3 Oct 1916	built at Hamburg; Interned, Scapa Flow, 22 Nov 1918; scuttled 21 Jun 1919.
V84	17 Aug 1916	6 Nov 1916	built at Hamburg; mined and sunk 26 May 1917 in 53°43′N 6°21′E (5 killed).
G85	24 Jul 1915	14 Dec 1915;	sunk in action with HMS Broke and HMS Swift, second battle of the Dover strait, 21 Apr 1917 in 51°9′N 1°37′E (35 killed).
G86	24 Aug 1915	11 Jan 1916	Interned, Scapa Flow, 22 Nov 1918; scuttled 21 Jun 1919.
G87	22 Sep 1915	10 Feb 1916	mined and sunk 06.20 hrs 30 Mar 1918 in 54°54′N 6°25′E (43 killed).
G88	16 Oct 1915	11 Mar 1916	torpedoed and sunk while at anchor off Zeebrugge by a Coastal Motor Boat of the 3rd CMB Division, 00.15 hrs 8 Apr 1917, in 51°22′N 3°15′E (18 killed).
G89	11 Dec 1915	10 May 1916	Interned, Scapa Flow, 22 Nov 1918; scuttled 21 Jun 1919.
G90	15 Jan 1916	15 Jun 1916	mined and sunk 03.52 hrs 11 Nov 1916, Gulf of Finland 59°23′N 22°48′E (11 killed).
G91	16 Nov 1915	22 Jul 1916	Interned, Scapa Flow, 22 Nov 1918; scuttled 21 Jun 1919.
G92	15 Feb 1916	25 Aug 1916	Interned, Scapa Flow, 22 Nov 1918; scuttled 21 Jun 1919.
G93	11 Jul 1916	27 Sep 1916	mined and sunk 06.30 hrs 30 Mar 1918 in 54°54′N 6°25′E (10 killed).
G94	1 Aug 1916	26 Oct 1916	mined and sunk 05.40 hrs 30 Mar 1918 in 54°54′N 6°25′E (13 killed).
G95	19 Aug 1916	25 Nov 1916	to UK 5 Aug 1920; scrapped, Sunderland, 1921.
G96	16 Sep 1916	23 Dec 1916	mined and sunk 01.30 hrs 26 Jun 1917 in 51°15′N 2°38.1′E (4 killed).

== Destroyers (Zerstörer) ==
Mobilization Program (Aug 1914)

Four vessels ordered on 7 Aug 1914 and 10 Aug 1914 to make use of machinery sets constructed in Germany for the Russian Orfey-class destroyers Leitenant Ilin, Kapitan Konon-Zotov, Gavriil and Michail.

Vessel	Launched	Completed	Fate.
B 97	15 Dec 1914	13 Feb 1915	to Italy 23 May 1920; commissioned as Cesare Rossarol^{(IT)}; stricken from the list 17 Jan 1939 and scrapped.
B 98	2 Jan 1915	24 Mar 1915	Postal vessel for the German fleet interned at Scapa Flow, 24 Jan 1919; scuttled, 21 Jun 1919.
V 99	9 Feb 1915	20 Apr 1915	mined and sunk 05.00 hrs 17 Aug 1915 off Miķeļtornis, Latvia in 57°37′N 21°52′E (21 killed).
V 100	8 Mar 1915	17 Jun 1915	Interned, Scapa Flow, 22 Nov 1918; beached while attempting to scuttle, 21 Jun 1919; to France, 1920; scrapped, 1921 (boilers used to refit destroyer Aventurier).

October 1914 order

Vessel	Launched	Completed	Fate.
B 109	11 Mar 1915	8 Jun 1915	Interned, Scapa Flow, 22 Nov 1918; scuttled 21 Jun 1919.
B 110	31 Mar 1915	26 Jun 1915	Interned, Scapa Flow, 22 Nov 1918; scuttled 21 Jun 1919.
B 111	8 Jun 1915	10 Aug 1915	Interned, Scapa Flow, 22 Nov 1918; scuttled 21 Jun 1919.
B 112	17 Jun 1915	3 Sep 1915	Interned, Scapa Flow, 22 Nov 1918; scuttled 21 Jun 1919

ex-Argentinian vessels

Requisitioned 15 Aug 1914.

Vessel	Launched	Completed	Fate.
G 101	12 Aug 1914	4 Mar 1915	ex Santiago del Estero; Interned, Scapa Flow, 22 Nov 1918; scuttled 21 Jun 1919.
G 102	16 Sep 1914	8 Apr 1915	ex San Luis; Interned, Scapa Flow, 22 Nov 1918; beached while attempting to scuttle, 21 Jun 1919; to USA, 1920; sunk as aircraft target, 13 Jul 1921 off Cape Henry.
G 103	14 Nov 1914	15 May 1915	ex Santa Fé; Interned, Scapa Flow, 22 Nov 1918; scuttled 21 Jun 1919.
G 104	28 Nov 1914	5 Jun 1915	ex Tucuman; Interned, Scapa Flow, 22 Nov 1918; scuttled 21 Jun 1919

== ex-Netherlands torpedoboats ==
Designed and built as Z1 – Z4 for the Netherlands, seized 10 Aug 1914.

Vessel	Launched	Completed	Fate.
V 105	26 Aug 1914	5 Jan 1915	to Brazil, 20 Aug 1920; sold to Britain, and exchanged with A 69 with Poland; commissioned as Polish Mazur; sunk by German aircraft 1 Sep 39 at Gdynia; later raised and scrapped.
V 106	26 Aug 1914	25 Jan 1915	to Brazil 20 Aug 1920; scrapped.
V 107	12 Dec 1914	3 Mar 1915	mined and sunk 8 May 1915 off Libau in 56°33′N 20°58′E (1 killed).
V 108	12 Dec 1914	23 Mar 1915	to Poland 20 Aug 1920; commissioned as Kaszub; sunk due to boiler explosion, 20 Jul 1925, Gdańsk Nowy Port; later raised and scrapped.

== Type 1916 ==
Apr 1916 Program

Vessel	Launched	Completed	Fate.
S 113	31 Jan 1918	5 Aug 1919	removed from service 5 Nov 1919; delivered to France, 23 May 1920 at Cherbourg; commissioned as Amiral Sénès^{(FR)}; decommissioned, 1936; sunk as target, 1938.
S 114	11 Apr 1918	–	about 75% finished; sold 3 Nov 1919; scrapped Bremerhaven.
S 115	20 Jun 1918	–	about 60% finished; sold, 3 Nov 1919; later scrapped at Bremerhaven.
V 116	2 Mar 1918	31 Jul 1918	to Italy 23 May 1920; commissioned as Premuda^{(IT)}; scrapped, 1939.
V 117	4 May 1918	–	about 75% finished; sold, 3 Nov 1919; scrapped, Hamburg, 1921.
V 118	6 Jul 1918	–	about 60% finished; sold, 3 Nov 1919; scrapped, Hamburg, 1921.
G 119	8 Oct 1918	–	about 90% finished; sold, 3 Nov 1919; later scrapped at Kiel.
G 120	–	–	about 75% finished (but not launched); sold, 3 Nov 1919; scrapped, Kiel, 1921.
G 121	–	–	about 68% finished (but not launched); sold, 3 Nov 1919; scrapped, Kiel, 1921.
B 122	16 Oct 1917	–	about 65% finished; sold, 3 Nov 1919; scrapped, Kiel, 1921.
B 123	26 Oct 1918	–	about 50% finished; sold, 3 Nov 1919; scrapped, Hamburg, 1921.
B 124	6 Jun 1919	–	about 40% finished; sold, 3 Nov 1919; scrapped, Hamburg, 1921

== 1916 Mobilization Type ==
June 1916 Program

Vessel	Launched	Completed	Fate.
V125	18 May 1917	29 Aug 1917	Interned, Scapa Flow, 22 Nov 1918; beached while attempting to scuttle, 21 Jun 1919; to UK, 1920; scrapped, Newport, 1922.
V126	30 Jun 1917	25 Sep 1917	Interned, Scapa Flow, 22 Nov 1918; beached while attempting to scuttle, 21 Jun 1919; to France, 1920; scrapped, (boilers used to refit destroyer Intrepide).
V127	28 Jul 1917	23 Oct 1917	Interned, Scapa Flow, 22 Nov 1918; beached while attempting to scuttle, 21 Jun 1919; to Japan, 1920; scrapped, Dordrecht, 1922.
V128	11 Aug 1917	15 Nov 1917	Interned, Scapa Flow, 22 Nov 1918; beached while attempting to scuttle, 21 Jun 1919; to UK, 1920; scrapped, Grangemouth, 1922.
V129	19 Oct 1917	20 Dec 1917	Interned, Scapa Flow, 6 Dec 1918 (as replacement for V 30, which was lost en route to the surrender); scuttled 21 Jun 1919.
V130	20 Nov 1917	2 Feb 1918	to France, 3 Aug 1920; commissioned as Buino ^{(FR)}; removed from active service, 15 Feb 1933.
S131	3 Mar 1917	11 Aug 1917	Interned, Scapa Flow, 22 Nov 1918; scuttled 21 Jun 1919.
S132	19 May 1917	2 Oct 1917	Interned, Scapa Flow, 22 Nov 1918; beached while attempting to scuttle, 21 Jun 1919; to USA, 1920; sunk as gunnery target by USS Delaware (BB-28) and destroyer USS Herbert (DD-160) off Cape Henry, 15 Jul 1921.
S133	1 Sep 1917	21 Feb 1918	to France, 20 Jul 1920; commissioned as Chastang^{(FR)}; removed from active service, 18 Aug 1933.
S134	25 Aug 1917	4 Jan 1918	to France 14 Jun 1920; commissioned as Vesco^{(FR)}; removed from active service, 24 Jul 1935.
S135	27 Oct 1917	15 Mar 1918	to France 20 Jul 1920; commissioned as Mazaré^{(FR)}; removed from active service, 24 Jul 1935.
S136	1 Dec 1917	30 Apr 1918	Interned, Scapa Flow, 22 Nov 1918; scuttled 21 Jun 1919.
S137	9 Mar 1918	14 Jun 1918	Interned, Scapa Flow, 22 Nov 1918; beached while attempting to scuttle, 21 Jun 1919; to UK, 1920; scrapped, 1922.
S138	22 Apr 1918	29 Jul 1918	Interned, Scapa Flow, 22 Nov 1918; scuttled 21 Jun 1919.
S139	24 Nov 1917	15 Apr 1918	to France 20 Jul 1920; commissioned as Deligny^{(FR)}; removed from active service, 18 Aug 1933.

Nov 1916 Program

Vessel	Launched	Completed	Fate.
V 140	22 Dec 1917	18 Nov 1918	built at Hamburg; sold 3 Nov 1919; stranded on Danish coast en route to breakers, 8 Dec 1920 and scrapped in situ.
V 141	26 Mar 1918	–	built at Hamburg; about 60% finished; sold, 3 Nov 1919; later scrapped, Kiel.
V 142	25 Sep 1918	–	about 40% finished; sold, 3 Nov 1919; later scrapped, Kiel.
V 143	25 Sep 1918	–	about 40% finished; sold, 3 Nov 1919; later scrapped, Kiel.
V 144	10 Oct 1918	–	less than 40% finished; sold, 3 Nov 1919; later scrapped, Kiel.
H 145	11 Dec 1917	4 Aug 1918	Interned, Scapa Flow, 22 Nov 1918; scuttled 21 Jun 1919.
H 146	23 Jan 1918	3 Oct 1918	to France 23 May 1920; commissioned as Rageot de la Touche^{(FR)}; removed from active service, 1935.
H 147	13 Mar 1918	13 Jul 1920	to France 23 May 1920; commissioned as Marcel Delage^{(FR)}; removed from active service, 1935.

1917 Program Total: 22 vessels (none completed).

Vessel	Launched	Completed	Fate.
G 148	–	–	cancelled 3 Nov 1919 and scrapped on slip.
G 149	–	–	cancelled 3 Nov 1919 and scrapped on slip.
G 150	–	–	cancelled 3 Nov 1919 and scrapped on slip.
Ww 151	–	–	nearly ready for launching at the time of the armistice; cancelled and scrapped on slip, 1920.
S 152	1918	–	c. 40%-50% finished at time of armistice; stricken 3 Nov 1919; incomplete hull sold for scrap, c. 1920.
S 153	1918	–	c. 40%-50% finished at time of armistice; stricken 3 Nov 1919; incomplete hull sold for scrap, c. 1920; stranded off Neukrug while transferring to Kiel for demolition; later raised and scrapped.
S 154	1918	–	c. 40%-50% finished at time of armistice; stricken 3 Nov 1919; incomplete hull sold for scrap, c. 1920.
S 155	1918	–	c. 40%-50% finished at time of armistice; stricken 3 Nov 1919; incomplete hull sold for scrap, c. 1920.
S 156	1918	–	c. 40%-50% finished at time of armistice; stricken 3 Nov 1919; incomplete hull sold for scrap, c. 1920; stranded off Neukrug while transferring to Kiel for demolition; later raised and scrapped.
S 157	1918	–	c. 40%-50% finished at time of armistice; stricken 3 Nov 1919; incomplete hull sold for scrap, c. 1920.
V 158	1 Nov 1918	–	c. 40% finished at time of armistice; stricken 3 Nov 1919; incomplete hull sold, 4 Jul 1920; scrapped Hamburg.
V 159	1 Nov 1918	–	c. 40% finished at time of armistice; stricken 3 Nov 1919; incomplete hull sold, 4 Jul 1920; scrapped Hamburg.
V 160	11 Mar 1921	–	cancelled; stranded off Hiddensee, Sassnitz while on tow to breakers; subsequently raised and scrapped.
V 161	–	–	cancelled and scrapped on slip.
V 162	–	–	cancelled and scrapped on slip.
V 163	–	–	cancelled and scrapped on slip.
V 164	–	–	cancelled and scrapped on slip.
V 165	–	–	cancelled and scrapped on slip.
H 166	25 Oct 1919	–	c. 55%-60% finished; stricken 3 Nov 1919, sold 1920 and scrapped Kiel.
H 167	26 Oct 1918	–	c. 55%-60% finished; stricken 3 Nov 1919, sold 1920 and scrapped Kiel.
H 168	8 Nov 1919	–	c. 55%-60% finished; stricken 3 Nov 1919, sold 1920 and scrapped Kiel.
H 169	19 Oct 1918	–	c. 55%-60% finished; stricken 3 Nov 1919, sold 1920 and scrapped Kiel.

== 1918 Mobilization Type ==
The final First World War-era German torpedo boat design were large (1,268 tons) vessels with geared turbines and a heavy armament (4 × 105 mm guns and 6 × 50 cm torpedo tubes).

Jan 1918 Program V 170-V 177, S 178-S 185 and H 186-H 193 (24 vessels in total; none completed). None had been launched by the time of the armistice, after which all contracts were cancelled. (Note: Four incomplete hulls were completed as mercantile vessels in 1920-21: S 178 and S 179 were completed as the four-masted schooners Franziska Kimme and Georg Kimme for the Bremerhaven Line (Bremerhavener Reederei AG) in 1920; and in November 1919, the incomplete hulls of ex-H 186 and ex-H 187 were purchased by the Baltic Shipping Company (Baltischen Reederei), Hamburg and completed as the cargo ships Hansdorf and Hoisdorf, entering service in spring 1921.)

Jun 1918 Program H 194-H 202, V 203-V 210 and S 211-S 223 (30 vessels in total, none completed). None of these proceeded further than a very preliminary stage of construction; all were cancelled after the armistice.

== Tactical organization ==
As an indication of the employment of the Imperial German Navy's large torpedo boats, the following provide skeleton orders of battle for these vessels at various dates during the First World War. The basic tactical unit was the Torpedo-Boat Flotilla, consisting of two half-flotillas (typically five vessels each) plus one vessel for the flotilla commander. (Note: The following abbreviations are used for brevity: TBF: Torpedo-Boat Flotilla (Torpedoboots Flottille in German); hf: Half-Flotilla (halbsflottille) (despite the name, a flotilla could consist of more than two half-flotillas); GF: Escort Flotilla (Geleit Flottille).)

=== Mid-October 1914 ===
This list shows the dispositions early in the war, after mobilization was complete
High Seas Fleet
I. TBF: V 191 (leader); 1. hf: V 186, V 190, V 188, G 197, V 189; 2. hf: G 196, G 193, G 195, G 192, G 194
II. TBF: S 149 (leader); 3. hf: S 138, S 139, S 141, S 140, S 142; 4. hf: S 144, S 145, S 147, S 146, S 148
III. TBF: S 167 (leader); 5. hf: V 162, V 163, V 164, S 165, S 166; 6. hf: G 173, G 169, G 172, G 170, S 168
IV. TBF: T 113 (leader); 7. hf: S 119, S 122, S 117, S 118, S 115; 8. hf: S 128, T 111, S 129, S 126, T 110
V. TBF: G 12 (leader); 9. hf: V 6, V 1, V 3, V 4, V 5; 10. hf: G 11, G 9, G 7, G 8, G 10
VI. TBF: V 150 (leader); 11. hf: V 151, V 153, V 154, V 152, V 155; 12. hf: V 156, V 157, V 159, V 158, V 160
VII. TBF: S 24 (leader); 13. hf: S 14, S 15, S 13, S 16, S 18; 14. hf: S 19, S 21, S 23, S 20, S 22
VIII. TBF: G 174 (leader); 15. hf: V 181, V 183, V 182, S 130, S 131; 16. hf: S 176, S 177, S 179, V 180, G 175
IX. TBF: S 28 (leader); 17. hf: V 25, V 26, V 27, S 31, S 32; 18. hf: V 30, V 29, S 33, S 34, S 35, S 36
tenders to U-Boat Flotillas: T 109, T 99, T 100, T 101
fleet tenders (attached to fleet flagship, battle Squadrons etc.): T 98, T 96

Other areas
Baltic: 19. hf: S 120, G 134, S 124, S 127, T 97; 20. hf: G 133, G 132, G 135, G 136
Coastal Defense: Jade/Weser Division : T 91, T 93, T 94, T 95, T 107; Elbe Division: S 114
East Asia: S 90

=== May 1916 ===
The following list of front line torpedo boats reflects the situation immediately prior to the Battle of Jutland.
High Seas Fleet
I. TBF: S 32 (leader); 1. hf: G 39, G 40, G 38, V 190, G 197; 2. hf: G 192, G 195, G 196, G 193
II. TBF: B 98 (leader); 3. hf: G 101, G 102, B 112, B 97; 4. hf: B 109, B 110, B 111, G 103, G 104
III. TBF: S 53 (leader); 5. hf: V 71, V 73, V 74, G 88, G 85; 6. hf: V 48, V 70, S 55, S 54, G 42
V. TBF: G 11 (leader); 9. hf: V 6, V 2, V 3, V 1, V 4; 10. hf: G 8, G 7, V 5, G 9, G 10
VI. TBF: G 41 (leader); 11. hf: V 44, S 49, V 43, G 87, G 86; 12. hf: V 69, S 50, V 46, V 45, G 37
VII. TBF: S 24 (leader); 13. hf: S 15, S 17, S 20, S 16, S 18; 14. hf: S 19, S 23, V 186, V 189
IX. TBF: V 28 (leader); 17. hf: V 27, V 26, S 36, S51, S 52; 18. hf: V 30, S 34, S 33, V 29, S 35

Baltic
VI. Scouting Group: V 100
IV. TBF: V 160 (leader); 7. hf: V 154, G 133, S 140, S 143, S 145, V 151, V 152, V 155, V 157, V 158, V 161
VIII. TBF: S 178 (leader); 15. hf: V 183, V 182, V 181, V 185, V 184; 16. hf: S 176, V 180, G 174, S 179, G 175
X. TBF: S 56 (leader); 19. hf: V 78, S 143, S 148, S 147, S 139; 20. hf: V 72, V 75, S 57, G 89, V 77
attached: T 107, S 146; 21. hf: S 167, G 169, G 170, S 168, G 137.

Flanders
Destroyer Flotilla: hf Cleve: V 67, V 68, V 47

Auxiliary service
Minesweeper flotillas: T 103, S 149, G 136, T 104
North Sea patrol flotillas: S 127, S 128; coastal defence: T 93, S 131, T 110, T 106, T 97, T 105, G 135, T 112, T 113, S 114, S 120, S 138
Tenders to U-Boat flotillas: T 159, T 99, G 137, T 101, G 132; fleet tenders: T 96, T 98
Training: G 134, S 126, S 122, S 121, S 131, V106, V 108, T 102, T 108, V 105, S 130, S 125

=== April 1918 ===
The following is the situation in the North Sea at the end of April 1918, at the time of the last offensive sortie of the High Seas Fleet.

High Seas Fleet
I. TBF: V 129 (leader); 1. hf: G 39, G 38, G 40, G 86, S 32; 2. hf: V 130, S 135, S 133, S 134, S 139
II. TBF: B 97 (leader); 3. hf: G 101, G 103, V 100, G 104, G 102; 4. hf: B 109, B 110, B 112, B 98, B 111
V. TBF: G 11 (leader); 9. hf: V 6, S 23, V 3, V 2, V 1, T 196, T 197; 10. hf: G 8, V 5, G 10, G 7, G 9, T 183, T 181
VI. TBF: V 128 (leader); 11. hf: V 127, V 126, S 131, V 125, S 132; 12. hf: V 43, V 45, S 50, S 49, V 46, V 44
VII. TBF: S 62 (leader); 13. hf: V 78, S 65, S 66, V 83, S 56; 14. hf: T 182, G 92, G 89 (G 87, G 93, G 94 were all sunk 30 Mar 1918)
VIII. TBF: T 180 (leader); 15. hf: T 193, T 195, T 192, T 189, T 190; 16. hf: T 176, T 178, T 174, T 179, T 186
IX. TBF: V 78 (leader); 17. hf: V 80, S 52, S 51, S 60, S 36; 18. hf: V 30, V 26, V 28, S 34, S 33
Serving with Mine-sweeping Flotillas: T 103, T 184, T 149, T 132
I. GF; 1. hf: T 127, T 114, T 109, T 101, T 125, T 112, T 99, T 106, T 102, T 105, T 93; 2. hf: T 185, S 19, S 24, T 122, T 148, S 18, T 135, T 147, T 131, T 196, T 197; 3. hf: T 136, T 92, T 104, T 128, T 138, T 97
II. GF: T 128; 5. hf: T 99; 6. hf: T 97; 7. hf: T 125; 8. hf: T 114; 9. hf: T 102; 10. hf: T 92, T 128; (T 103 repairing)

=== September 1918 ===
The following is the disposition of all of Germany's ocean-going torpedo boats shortly before the end of the war.

High Seas Fleet
I. TBF: 1. hf: V 129, S 32, G 38, G 39, G 40, G 86; 2. hf: V 130, S 134, S 133, S 135, S 139
II. TBF: 3. hf: B 98, G 101, G 102, G 103, G 104, V 100; 4. hf: B 97, B 109, B 110, B 111, B 112
V. TBF: 9. hf: G 11, V 1, V 2, V 3, V 6, S 23; 10. hf: V 5, G 7, G 8, G 10
VI. TBF: 11. hf: V 128, V 125, V 126, V 127, S 131, S 132; 12. hf: V 43, V 44, V 45, V 46, S 49, S 50
VII. TBF: (V 116 to join); 13. hf: V 83, V 78, S 65, S 56 (S 138 to join); 14. hf: G 92, G 89 (S 136, S 137, H145 to join)
VIII. TBF: 15. hf: T 180, T 189, T 190, T 193, T 195; 16. hf: T 174, T 176, T 178, T 179, T 186
IX. TBF: 17. hf: V 79, S 36, S 51, S 52, S 60, V 80; 18. hf: V 26, V 28, V 30, S 33, S 34
I. GF: 1. hf: T 127, T 109, T 112, T 93, T 170, T 165, T 182, T 183, T 181; 2. hf: T 185, S 19, S 24, T 122, T 148, T 113, S 18, T 135, T 147, T 131, T 197, T 196; 3. hf: T 136, T 169 (plus twelve "A" Boats)
II. GF: 5. hf: T 99; 6. hf: T 97; 7. hf: T 125; 8. hf: T 114; 9. hf: T 102; 10. hf: T 92, T 128; (T 103 repairing)
Serving with Mine-sweeping Flotillas: T 184, T 132, T 96, T 98

Baltic
IV. TBF: 7. hf: T 160, T 133, T 139, T 140, T 143, T 145, T 151, T 152, T 154; 19. hf: T 155, T 157, T 158, T 104, T 106, T 175, T 101, T 105

Flanders
III. TBF: 5. hf: V 71, S 53, V 73, V 81, G 41, V 77; 6. hf: S 54, S 55, V 70, G 91
Flanders Destroyer Flotilla: 1. hf: V 47, V 67, G 95, S 61; 2. hf: S 63, V 69, V 82
out of service: S 15, V 74

Auxiliary service
Baltic Training Flotilla: 1. hf: T 173, T 166, T 134, V 108, T 107; 2. hf: T 167, T 163, T 142, T 126
Gunnery training: T 144, T 146, T 168, V 105
Mine warfare vessels: V 106, T 110, T 120
Tenders to U-boat flotillas: T 130, T 137, T 153, T 159, T 161, T 164, T 108, T 121
Fleet tenders, etc.: T 91, T 94, T 95, T 111, T 156, T 141.

== See also ==
English language

- High Seas Fleet
- Order of battle at Jutland
- Scuttling of the German fleet at Scapa Flow
- Small torpedo boats of World War I (S 7-class, S 66-class, G 88 & G 89)
- A-class torpedo boat (coastal torpedo boats)

German language

- Großes Torpedoboot (Large Torpedo-Boats)
- Liste deutscher Großer Torpedoboote (1898–1919) (List of German Large Torpedo-Boats (1898–1919))
- Liste deutscher Torpedoboote (1898–1919) (List of German Torpedo-Boats (1898–1919))
- Liste der Küstentorpedoboote der A-Klassen (List of Coastal Torpedo-Boats of the A-Classes)

== Bibliography ==
- Dodson, Aidan (2019). "Beyond the Kaiser: The IGN's Destroyers and Torpedo Boats After 1918". In Jordan, John (ed.). Warship 2019. Oxford, UK: Osprey Publishing. pp. 129–144. ISBN 978-1-4728-3595-6.
- Robert Gardiner, editor, Conway's All The World's Fighting Ships 1906–1921. (London: Conway Maritime Press, 1985). ISBN 0-85177-245-5
- Erich Gröner, German Warships 1815–1945, Volume 1: Major Surface Vessels (London: Conway Maritime Press, 1990). ISBN 0-85177-533-0
- John C. Taylor, German Warships of World War I (London: Ian Allan Ltd., 1969). ISBN 0-71100-099-9
