= SMS S178 =

S138-class large torpedo boat

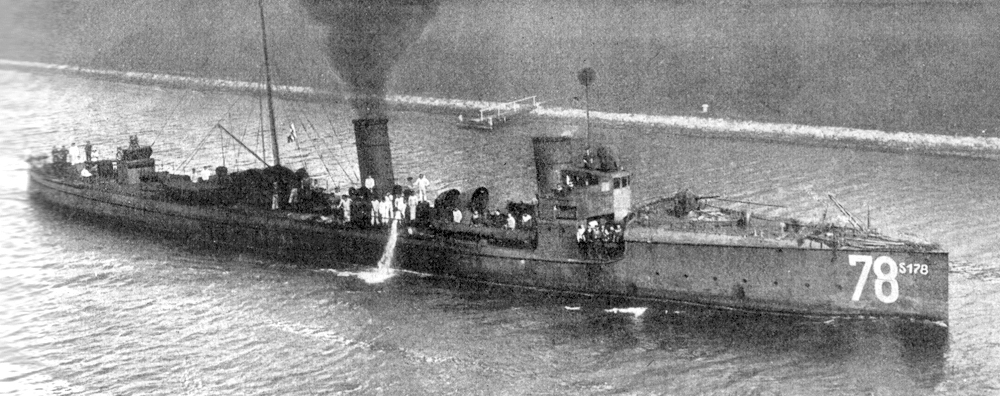

History

Germany
- Name: S178 until 22 February 1918; T178 from 22 February 1918
- Builder: Schichau-Werke, Elbing
- Launched: 14 July 1910
- Completed: 9 December 1910

General characteristics
- Class & type: S138-class torpedo boat
- Displacement: 650 t (640 long tons) design
- Length: 73.9 m (242 ft 5 in) o/a
- Beam: 7.9 m (25 ft 11 in)
- Draught: 3.07 m (10 ft 1 in)
- Installed power: 18,000 PS (18,000 shp; 13,000 kW)
- Propulsion: 3 × boilers; 2 × steam turbines
- Speed: 32 knots (59 km/h; 37 mph)
- Complement: 84
- Armament: 2 × 8.8 cm guns; 4 × 50 cm torpedo tubes

SMS S178 (Note: "SMS" stands for "Seiner Majestät Schiff" (transl. His Majesty's Ship)) (Note: The "S" in S178 denoted the shipbuilder who constructed her, in this case Schichau-Werke.) was a S138-class large torpedo boat of the Imperial German Navy. She was built by the Schichau-Werke at Elbing in 1909–1910, launching on 14 July 1910 and completing on 9 December that year.

S178 was sunk in a collision with the German armoured cruiser Yorck on 4 March 1913, but her wreck was salvaged and rebuilt, and the torpedo boat re-entered service in 1915. She served through the rest of the First World War, operating both in the North and Baltic Seas, taking part in the Battle of Dogger Bank in 1915, the Battle of the Gulf of Riga in August 1915 and Operation Albion, the German invasion and occupation of the West Estonian Archipelago in 1917. She was renamed T178 in February 1918.

Following the end of the First World War, T178 was surrendered as a reparation under the terms of the Treaty of Versailles, and was scrapped in 1922.

== Construction and design ==
The Imperial German Navy ordered 12 large torpedo boats (Große Torpedoboote) as part of the fiscal year 1909 shipbuilding programme, with two ships (G174 and G175) ordered from Germaniawerft, four (S176–S179) from Schichau-Werke and the remaining six ships (V180–V185) from AG Vulcan. The orders were split between the three shipyards in order to manage the workload and ensure continuous employment at all three companies. The four Schichau torpedo boats closely resembled the four torpedo boats that Schichau had built under the 1908 programme which had been sold to the Ottoman Empire during construction, and their replacements, S165–S168.

S178 was 74.2 metres (243 ft 5 in) long overall and 74.6 metres (244 ft 9 in) at the waterline, with a beam of 7.9 metres (25 ft 11 in) and a draught of 3.10 m (10 ft 2 in). The ship displaced 666 tonnes (655 long tons) design and 781 tonnes (769 long tons) deep load. Three coal-fired and one oil-fired water-tube boilers fed steam at a pressure of 17 atm (250 psi) to two sets of Schichau direct-drive steam turbines. The ship's machinery was rated at 17,600 PS (17,400 shp; 12,900 kW) giving a design speed of 32 knots (59 km/h; 37 mph), with members of the class reaching a speed of 32.9 knots (60.9 km/h; 37.9 mph) during sea trials.

The ship was armed with two 8.8 cm SK L/30 guns, (Note: SK stood for Schnellfeuerkanone (quick-firing gun) or Schnellade-Kanone (fast-loading gun).) (Note: In Imperial German Navy gun nomenclature, the L/30 denotes the length of the gun. In this case, the L/30 gun is 30 caliber, meaning that the gun barrel has an overall length 30 times greater than the gun's bore.) one on the forecastle and one aft. The guns were later replaced by 8.8 cm SK L/45 guns. Four single 50 cm (19.7 in) torpedo tubes were fitted, with two on the ship's beam in the gap behind the ship's bridge and fore funnel, and two aft of the second funnel. The ship had a crew of 3 officers and 81 other ranks.

Construction of S178 began at Schichau's Elbing, Prussia (now Elbląg, Poland) shipyard as yard number 841 in 1909. The ship was launched on 14 July 1910 and commissioned on 9 December that year.

== Service ==
=== Initial service and sinking ===
In 1911, S178 was a member of the 12th half-flotilla of the 6th Torpedo Boat Flotilla. The ship remained in this unit through 1912.

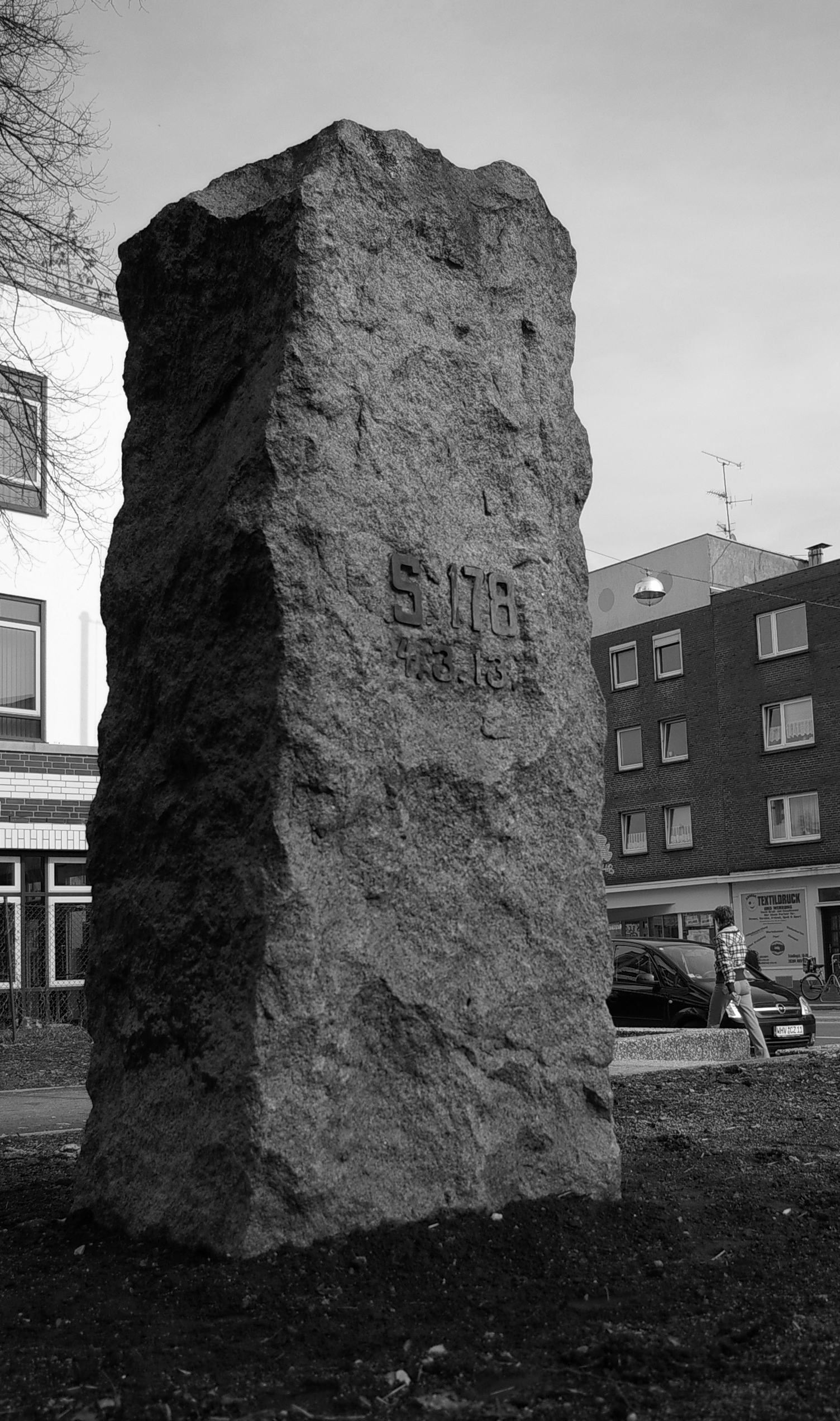
A memorial to S178's sinking in Wilhelmshaven

On 4 March 1913, S178 was taking part in a training exercise off Helgoland when the torpedo boat attempted to cut in front of the armoured cruiser Yorck but failed and was rammed by Yorck. The impact tore open S178's boiler and engine rooms, and the torpedo boat sank quickly, with only 15 men rescued by Yorck the battleship Oldenburg and the torpedo boat S177. Sixty-nine men were killed. It was decided to salvage the wreck of S178, but on 5 May 1913, the salvage boat Unterelbe, which was taking part in the salvage operations, capsized, drowning seven men, while on the next day, a dinghy carrying Kapitänleutnant Georg von Zastrow, S178's former commanding officer, who had left the ship on the day of the sinking, capsized, killing von Zastrow. S178's wreck was finally raised in two pieces in July 1913 by the salvage ship Oberelbe.

=== First World War ===
After salvage and reconstruction, S178 re-entered service early in 1915. On 23 January 1915, a German force of Battlecruisers and light cruisers, escorted by torpedo boats, and commanded by Admiral Franz von Hipper, made a sortie to attack British fishing boats on the Dogger Bank. S178, as leader of the 8th Torpedo boat Flotilla, formed part of the escort for Hipper's force. British battlecruisers supported by the Harwich Force of light cruisers and destroyers intercepted the German force on the morning of 24 January in the Battle of Dogger Bank. S178 suffered a boiler failure during the action, which caused the torpedo boat to lag behind the main German force, so that she risked being overwhelmed by the pursuing British force. The commander of the 8th Flotilla aboard S178, Korvettenkapitän Hundertmarck, had decided to carry out a single-handed torpedo attack against the British battle line, when the order came through from Admiral Hipper for a more general torpedo boat attack, which S178 was to take part in. However, after the British force turned away after an apparent sighting of a submarine periscope, the torpedo boat attack was abandoned.

In early May 1915, the 8th Flotilla, with S178 as lead, was sent to the Baltic Sea as part of a major deployment of ships from the High Seas Fleet to reinforce the German naval forces in the Baltic, which were deployed to support the German Army's advance on Libau (now Liepāja), Latvia. The forces from the High Seas Fleet returned to the North Sea shortly after the German capture of Libau on 8 May 1915. On 17 May 1915, the 15th and 18th half-flotillas left Kiel as the escort for the laying of a minefield off the Doggerbank by the light cruisers Stralsund and Strassburg, with a large force from the High Seas Fleet operating in distant support. Early on 18 May, the torpedo boat V157 rammed V150, sinking V150, while later that day, the light cruiser Danzig stuck a mine and was taken under tow by the cruiser Berlin. S178 and V180 spotted large numbers of floating mines in the vicinity of Danzig's mining.

In July 1915, the 8th Torpedo Boat flotilla, with S178 still in the role of leader, was deployed to the Baltic again together with the pre-dreadnought battleships of the IV Battle Squadron as temporary reinforcements following recent losses of warships in the Baltic. On 10–11 July, S178 was part of the escort for a large sortie by battleships and armoured cruisers to the north of Gotland. The 8th Torpedo Boat Flotilla continued to operate in the Baltic for the rest of July 1915, and by August that year was formally considered part of the German Baltic Fleet. That month, the German Baltic Fleet, supported by a large portion of the High Seas Fleet, launched a major operation in the Gulf of Riga in support of the advance of German troops (later called the Battle of the Gulf of Riga). It was planned to enter the gulf via the Irben Strait, defeating any Russian naval forces and mining the entrance to Moon Sound. The 8th Flotilla supported these operations. On 19 August, the German fleet entered the Gulf of Riga, and encountered the Russian gunboats Sivuch and Korietz. Sivuch was shelled by the battleships Posen and Nassau, while S178 and four other German torpedo boats (S176, S179, V185 and V29) attacked with torpedoes. Sivuch sank, with the torpedo boats rescuing 50 of the gunboat's crew.

On 26 May 1916, the large torpedo boat V100 was torpedoed by the British submarine E18 40 nautical miles (74 km; 46 mi) northwest of Steinort (now Gleźnowo, Poland). The torpedo badly damaged V100, blowing off the torpedo boat's bow, killing 40 men and causing heavy flooding. S178 and V180 supported the stricken torpedo boat while S176 took V100 under stern-first tow, until they reached port. In October 1917, the Germans carried out Operation Albion, an amphibious assault to capture Ösel and Muhu islands off the coast of Estonia. S178 was a member of the 16th half-flotilla of the 8th Torpedo Boat flotilla during these operations.

On 22 February 1918, S178 was renamed T178 in order to free up her name for new construction, in this case the 1918 Mobilisation type S178, which was laid down but never completed. The October Revolution in Russia and the subsequent Armistice between Russia and the Central Powers allowed the release of forces from the Baltic to the North Sea, and by the end of April 1918, the 8th Flotilla had returned to the High Seas Fleet, with T178 remaining part of the 16th half-flotilla. T178 was still part of the 16th half-flotilla at the end of the war.

=== Disposal ===
The Armistice of 11 November 1918 resulted in most of the High Seas Fleet being interned at Scapa Flow. T178 was initially retained by Germany, but following the Scuttling of the German fleet at Scapa Flow on 21 June 1919, the terms of Treaty of Versailles required more ships to be surrendered to compensate for the scuttled ships. These additional ships included T178 which was stricken in September 1920. The ship was sold for scrap in February–March 1921 and broken up at Dordrecht in the Netherlands in 1922.

== Bibliography ==
- Chesneau, Roger; Kolesnik, Eugene M., eds. (1979). Conway's All The World's Fighting Ships 1860–1905. London: Conway Maritime Press. ISBN 0-85177-133-5.
- Dodson, Aidan (2019). "Beyond the Kaiser: The IGN's Destroyers and Torpedo Boats After 1918". In Jordan, John (ed.). Warship 2019. Oxford, UK: Osprey Publishing. pp. 129–144. ISBN 978-1-4728-3595-6.
- Fock, Harald (1981). Schwarze Gesellen: Band 2: Zerstörer bis 1914 (in German). Herford, Germany: Koelers Verlagsgesellschaft mBH. ISBN 3-7822-0206-6.
- Fock, Harald (1989). Z-Vor! Internationale Entwicklung und Kriegseinsätze von Zerstörern und Torpedobooten 1914 bis 1939 (in German). Herford, Germany: Koehlers Verlagsgesellschaft mBH. ISBN 3-7822-0207-4.
- Friedman, Norman (2011). Naval Weapons of World War One: Guns, Torpedoes, Mines and ASW Weapons of All Nations: An Illustrated Directory. Barnsley, UK: Seaforth Publishing. ISBN 978-1-84832-100-7.
- von Gagern, Ernst (1962). Der Krieg in der Ostsee: Dritter Band: Von Anfang 1916 bis zum Kriegsende (in German). Frankfurt: Verlag von E.S. Mittler & Sohn.
- Gardiner, Robert; Gray, Randal, eds. (1985). Conway's All The World's Fighting Ships 1906–1921. London: Conway Maritime Press. ISBN 0-85177-245-5.
- Gladisch, Walter, ed. (1965). Der Krieg in der Nordsee: Band 7: Vom Sommer 1917 bis zum Kriegsende 1918. Der Krieg zur See: 1914–1918. Frankfurt: Verlag E.S. Mittler & Sohn.
- Gröner, Erich; Jung, Dieter; Maass, Martin (1983). Die deutschen Kriegsschiffe 1815–1945: Band 2: Torpedoboote, Zerstörer, Schnellboote, Minensuchboote, Minenräumboote (in German). Koblenz: Bernard & Graef Verlag. ISBN 3-7637-4801-6.
- Gröner, Erich; Jung, Dieter; Maass, Martin (1990). German Warships 1915–1945: Volume One: Major Surface Vessels. Annapolis, Maryland, US: Naval Institute Press. ISBN 0-87021-790-9.
- Groos, O. (1923). Der Krieg in der Nordsee: Dritter Band: Von Ende November 1914 bis Unfang Februar 1915. Der Krieg zur See: 1914–1918 (in German). Berlin: Verlag von E. S. Mittler und Sohn – via National Library of Estonia.
- Groos, O. (1924). Der Krieg in der Nordsee: Vierter Band: Von Anfang Februar bis Ende Dezember 1915. Der Krieg zur See: 1914–1918 (in German). Berlin: Verlag von E. S. Mittler und Sohn – via National Library of Estonia.
- Halpern, Paul G. (1994). A Naval History of World War I. London: UCL Press. ISBN 1-85728-498-4.
- Hildebrand, Hans H.; Röhr, Albert; Steinmetz, Hans-Otto (1982). Die Deutschen Kriegschiffe: Biographen — ein Spiegel der Marinegeschichte von 1815 bis zur Gegenwart: Band 6 (in German). Herford, Germany: Koehlers Verlagsgesellschaft MBH. ISBN 3-7822-0237-6.
- Massie, Robert K. (2007). Castles of Steel: Britain, Germany and the Winning of the Great War at Sea. London: Vintage Books. ISBN 978-0-099-52378-9.
- Moore, John (1990). Jane's Fighting Ships of World War I. London: Studio. ISBN 1-85170-378-0.
- Rollmann, Heinrich (1929). Der Krieg in der Ostsee: Zweiter Band: Das Kreigjahr 1915. Der Krieg zur See: 1914–1918 (in German). Berlin: Verlag von E. S. Mittler und Sohn.
- Stoelzel, Albert (1930). Ehrenrangliste der Kaiserlich Deutschen Marine 1914–1918 (in German). Berlin: Thormann & Goetsch.
