= SMS S176 =

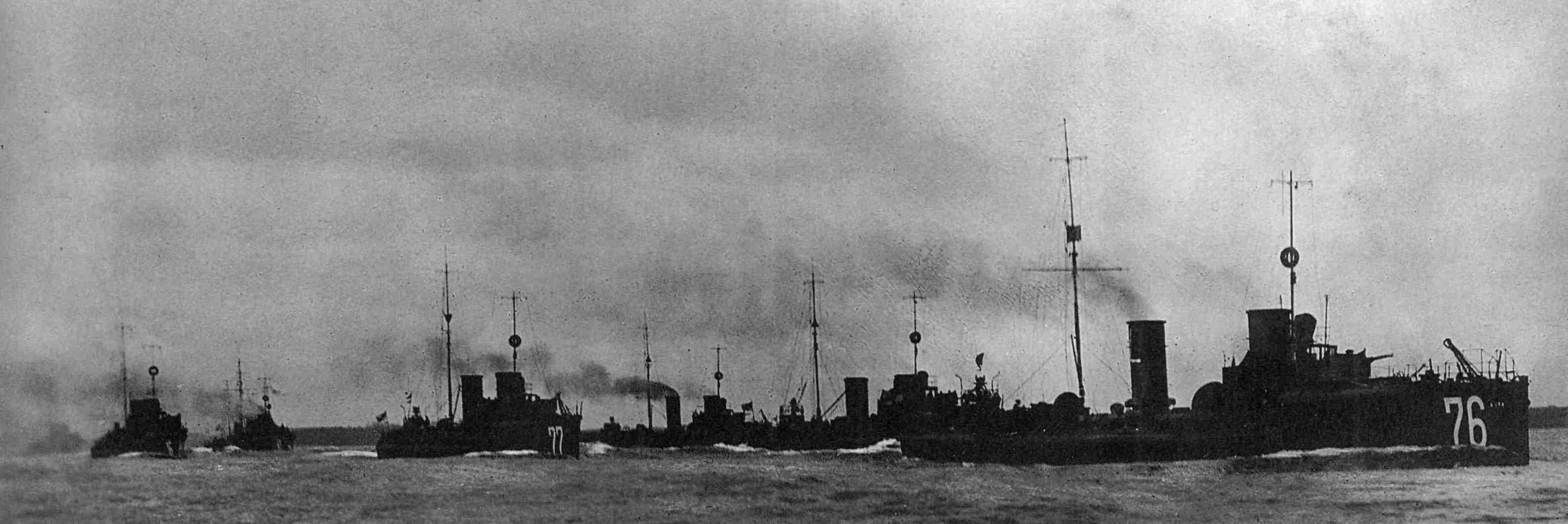
- Several German torpedo boats, with SMS S176 and S177 in the foreground

History

Germany
- Name: S176 until 22 February 1918; T176 from 22 February 1918
- Builder: Schichau-Werke, Elbing
- Launched: 23 September 1910
- Completed: 6 July 1910
- Fate: Scrapped 1922

General characteristics
- Class & type: S138-class torpedo boat
- Displacement: 650 t (640 long tons) design
- Length: 73.9 m (242 ft 5 in) o/a
- Beam: 7.9 m (25 ft 11 in)
- Draught: 3.07 m (10 ft 1 in)
- Installed power: 18,000 PS (18,000 shp; 13,000 kW)
- Propulsion: 3 × boilers; 2 × steam turbines
- Speed: 32 knots (59 km/h; 37 mph)
- Complement: 84
- Armament: 2 × 8.8 cm guns; 4 × 50 cm torpedo tubes

SMS S176 (Note: "SMS" stands for "Seiner Majestät Schiff" (transl. His Majesty's Ship)) (Note: The "S" in S176 denoted the shipbuilder who constructed her, in this case Schichau-Werke.) was a S138-class large torpedo boat of the Imperial German Navy. She was built by the Schichau-Werke at Elbing in 1909–1910, launching on 12 April 1910 and completing on 23 September that year.

S176 took part in the First World War, serving in the North Sea and the Baltic Sea, taking part in the Battle of the Gulf of Riga in August 1915 and Operation Albion, the German invasion and occupation of the West Estonian Archipelago in 1917. She was renamed T176 in February 1918. Following the end of the First World War, T176 was surrendered as a reparation under the terms of the Treaty of Versailles, and was sold for scrap in 1922.

== Construction and design ==
The Imperial German Navy ordered 12 large torpedo boats (Große Torpedoboote) as part of the fiscal year 1909 shipbuilding programme, with two ships (G174 and G175) ordered from Germaniawerft, four (S176–S179) from Schichau-Werke and the remaining six ships (V180–V185) from AG Vulcan. The orders were split between the three shipyards in order to manage the workload and ensure continuous employment at all three companies. The four Schichau torpedo boats closely resembled the four torpedo boats that Schichau had built under the 1908 programme which had been sold to the Ottoman Empire during construction, and their replacements, S165–S168.

S176 was 74.2 metres (243 ft 5 in) long overall and 74.6 metres (244 ft 9 in) at the waterline, with a beam of 7.9 metres (25 ft 11 in) and a draught of 3.10 m (10 ft 2 in). The ship displaced 666 tonnes (655 long tons) design and 781 tonnes (769 long tons) deep load. Three coal-fired and one oil-fired water-tube boilers fed steam at a pressure of 17 atm (250 psi) to two sets of Schichau direct-drive steam turbines. The ship's machinery was rated at 17,600 PS (17,400 shp; 12,900 kW) giving a design speed of 32 knots (59 km/h; 37 mph), with members of the class reaching a speed of 32.9 knots (60.9 km/h; 37.9 mph) during sea trials.

The ship was armed with two 8.8 cm SK L/30 guns, (Note: SK stood for Schnellfeuerkanone (quick-firing gun) or Schnellade-Kanone (fast-loading gun).) (Note: In Imperial German Navy gun nomenclature, the L/30 denotes the length of the gun. In this case, the L/30 gun is 30 caliber, meaning that the gun barrel has an overall length 30 times greater than the gun's bore.) one on the forecastle and one aft. The guns were later replaced by 8.8 cm SK L/45 guns. Four single 50 cm (19.7 in) torpedo tubes were fitted, with two on the ship's beam in the gap behind the ship's bridge and fore funnel, and two aft of the second funnel. The ship had a crew of 3 officers and 81 other ranks.

Construction of S176 began at Schichau's Elbing, Prussia (now Elbląg, Poland) shipyard as yard number 839 in 1909. The ship was launched on 12 April 1910 and commissioned on 23 September that year.

== Service ==
In 1911, S176 was leader of the 12th half-flotilla of the 6th Torpedo Boat Flotilla. The ship remained in this role through 1912, and in 1913, although the half-flotilla was now in reserve.

=== First World War ===
The Imperial German Navy mobilised on 1 August 1914, owing to the imminent outbreak of the First World War. By 10 August, S176 was a member of the 16th half-flotilla of the 8th Torpedo Boat Flotilla. In October 1914 the 8th Torpedo Boat flotilla, including S176, was temporarily detached to the Baltic Sea as part of a large scale deployment of torpedo boats from both the High Seas Fleet and training units to counter operations of British submarines in the Baltic. The 8th Flotilla returned to the North Sea at the end of the month.

The 8th Torpedo Boat flotilla, including S176, was deployed to the Baltic together with the pre-dreadnought battleships of the IV Battle Squadron as temporary reinforcements in July 1915. On 10–11 July, S176 was part of the escort for a large sortie by battleships and armoured cruisers to the north of Gotland. In August 1915 the German Baltic Fleet, supported by a large portion of the High Seas Fleet, launched a major operation (later called the Battle of the Gulf of Riga) in the Gulf of Riga in support of the advance of German troops. It was planned to enter the gulf via the Irben Strait, defeating any Russian naval forces and mining the entrance to Moon Sound. The 8th Flotilla, now listed as part of the Baltic Fleet, took part in this operation. On 19 August, the German fleet entered the Gulf of Riga, and encountered the Russian gunboats Sivuch and Korietz. Sivuch was shelled by the battleships Posen and Nassau, while S176 and four other German torpedo boats (S178, S179, V185 and V29) attacked with torpedoes. Sivuch sank, with the torpedo boats rescuing 50 of the gunboat's crew. On 23 December, the Vorpostenboot (patrol boat) Freya struck a mine and sank between Windau (now Ventspils, Latvia) and Lyserort. S176 and S177 went to the scene in response to radio signals from another Vorpostenboot, and found themselves surrounded by floating mines. Four survivors were picked up from Freya's crew of 26, (rescue attempts were hampered by the low temperatures (−15 °C, 5 °F) which froze the ships' cutters to their decks). On the return journey to Windau, S177 struck a mine and sank, killing 7 of her crew. The same minefield had sunk the German cruiser Bremen and torpedo boat V191 two days earlier.

On 26 May 1916, the large torpedo boat V100 was torpedoed by the British submarine E18 40 nautical miles (74 km; 46 mi) northwest of Steinort (now Gleźnowo, Poland). The torpedo badly damaged V100, blowing off the torpedo boat's bow, killing 40 men and causing heavy flooding. S176 took V100 under stern-first tow, while V180 and S178 supported the stricken torpedo boat until they reached port.

In October 1917, the Germans carried out Operation Albion, an amphibious assault to capture Ösel and Muhu islands off the coast of Estonia. S176 was leader of the 16th half-flotilla of the 8th Torpedo Boat flotilla during these operations. On 20 October 1917, S176 and V186 were escorting the netlayer Eskimo south of Abruka when the British submarine C32 fired two torpedoes at Eskimo which passed astern of the netlayer. S176 and V186 then counter-attacked with depth charges, but the submarine managed to escape the attack. C32 had sustained sufficient damage in the attack, including knocking out the submarine's compass, that her commanding officer decided to scuttle her, and the submarine was run aground and destroyed with explosives.

On 22 February 1918, V176 was renamed T176 in order to free up her name for new construction, in this case the 1918 Mobilisation type V176, which never started construction. The October Revolution in Russia and the subsequent Armistice between Russia and the Central Powers allowed the release of forces from the Baltic to the North Sea, and by the end of April 1918, the 8th Flotilla had returned to the High Seas Fleet, with T176 remaining part of the 16th half-flotilla. T176 was still part of the 16th half-flotilla at the end of the war.

=== Disposal ===
The Armistice of 11 November 1918 resulted in most of the High Seas Fleet being interned at Scapa Flow. T176 was initially retained by Germany, but following the Scuttling of the German fleet at Scapa Flow on 21 June 1919, the terms of Treaty of Versailles required more ships to be surrendered to compensate for the scuttled ships. These additional ships included T176 which was stricken in September 1920. The ship was sold for scrap in February–March 1921 and broken up at Montrose, Scotland in 1922.

== Bibliography ==
- Chesneau, Roger; Kolesnik, Eugene M., eds. (1979). Conway's All The World's Fighting Ships 1860–1905. London: Conway Maritime Press. ISBN 0-85177-133-5.
- Dodson, Aidan (2019). "Beyond the Kaiser: The IGN's Destroyers and Torpedo Boats After 1918". In Jordan, John (ed.). Warship 2019. Oxford, UK: Osprey Publishing. pp. 129–144. ISBN 978-1-4728-3595-6.
- Firle, Rudolph (1921). Der Krieg in der Ostsee: Erster Band: Von Kriegsbeginn bis Mitte März 1915. Der Krieg zur See: 1914–1918 (in German). Berlin: Verlag von E. S. Mittler und Sohn.
- Fock, Harald (1981). Schwarze Gesellen: Band 2: Zerstörer bis 1914 (in German). Herford, Germany: Koelers Verlagsgesellschaft mBH. ISBN 3-7822-0206-6.
- Fock, Harald (1989). Z-Vor! Internationale Entwicklung und Kriegseinsätze von Zerstörern und Torpedobooten 1914 bis 1939 (in German). Herford, Germany: Koehlers Verlagsgesellschaft mBH. ISBN 3-7822-0207-4.
- Friedman, Norman (2011). Naval Weapons of World War One: Guns, Torpedoes, Mines and ASW Weapons of All Nations: An Illustrated Directory. Barnsley, UK: Seaforth Publishing. ISBN 978-1-84832-100-7.
- von Gagern, Ernst (1962). Der Krieg in der Ostsee: Dritter Band: Von Anfang 1916 bis zum Kriegsende (in German). Frankfurt: Verlag von E.S. Mittler & Sohn.
- Gardiner, Robert; Gray, Randal, eds. (1985). Conway's All The World's Fighting Ships 1906–1921. London: Conway Maritime Press. ISBN 0-85177-245-5.
- Gladisch, Walter, ed. (1965). Der Krieg in der Nordsee: Band 7: Vom Sommer 1917 bis zum Kriegsende 1918. Der Krieg zur See: 1914–1918. Frankfurt: Verlag E.S. Mittler & Sohn.
- Gröner, Erich; Jung, Dieter; Maass, Martin (1983). Die deutschen Kriegsschiffe 1815–1945: Band 2: Torpedoboote, Zerstörer, Schnellboote, Minensuchboote, Minenräumboote (in German). Koblenz: Bernard & Graef Verlag. ISBN 3-7637-4801-6.
- Gröner, Erich; Jung, Dieter; Maass, Martin (1990). German Warships 1915–1945: Volume One: Major Surface Vessels. Annapolis, Maryland, US: Naval Institute Press. ISBN 0-87021-790-9.
- Groos, O. (1920). Der Krieg in der Nordsee: Erster Band: Von Kreigsbeginn bis Anfang September 1914. Der Krieg zur See: 1914–1918 (in German). Berlin: Verlag von E. S. Mittler und Sohn – via National Library of Estonia.
- Halpern, Paul G. (1994). A Naval History of World War I. London: UCL Press. ISBN 1-85728-498-4.
- Moore, John (1990). Jane's Fighting Ships of World War I. London: Studio. ISBN 1-85170-378-0.
- Rollmann, Heinrich (1929). Der Krieg in der Ostsee: Zweiter Band: Das Kreigjahr 1915. Der Krieg zur See: 1914–1918 (in German). Berlin: Verlag von E. S. Mittler und Sohn.
- Staff, Gary (2008). Battle for the Baltic Islands 1917: Triumph of the Imperial German Navy. Barnsley, UK: Pen & Sword Maritime. ISBN 9781783033188.
- Stoelzel, Albert (1930). Ehrenrangliste der Kaiserlich Deutschen Marine 1914–1918 (in German). Berlin: Thormann & Goetsch.
