= SMS S177 =

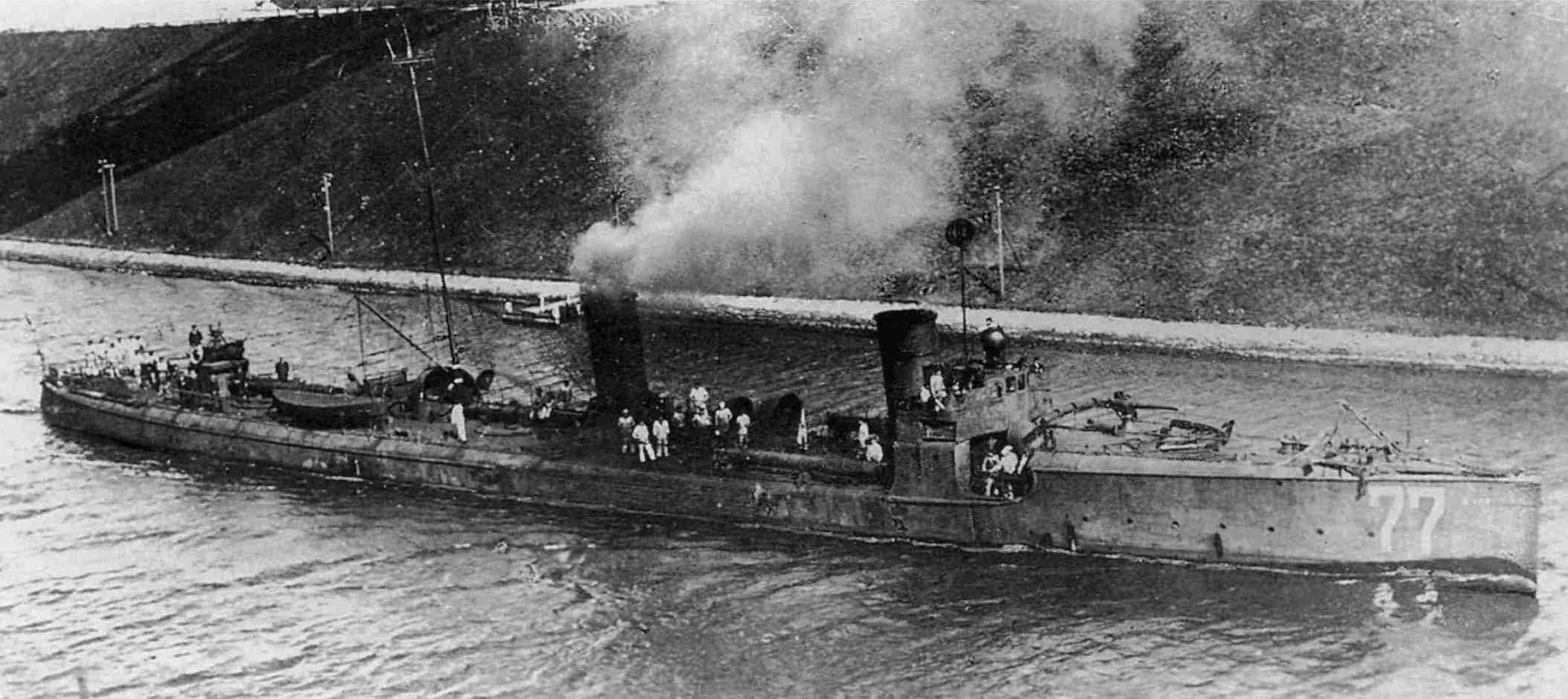

History

Germany
- Name: S177
- Builder: Schichau-Werke, Elbing
- Launched: 21 May 1910
- Completed: 16 February 1911
- Fate: sunk by mine 23 December 1915

General characteristics
- Class & type: S138-class torpedo boat
- Displacement: 650 t (640 long tons) design
- Length: 73.9 m (242 ft 5 in) o/a
- Beam: 7.9 m (25 ft 11 in)
- Draught: 3.07 m (10 ft 1 in)
- Installed power: 18,000 PS (18,000 shp; 13,000 kW)
- Propulsion: 3 × boilers; 2 × steam turbines
- Speed: 32 knots (59 km/h; 37 mph)
- Complement: 84
- Armament: 2 × 8.8 cm guns; 4 × 50 cm torpedo tubes

SMS S177 (Note: "SMS" stands for "Seiner Majestät Schiff" (transl. His Majesty's Ship)) (Note: The "S" in S177 denoted the shipbuilder who constructed her, in this case Schichau-Werke.) was a S138-class large torpedo boat of the Imperial German Navy. She was built by the Schichau-Werke at Elbing in 1909–1910, launching on 21 May 1910 and completing on 16 February 1911.

S177 took part in the First World War, and was sunk by a mine on 23 December 1915.

== Construction and design ==
The Imperial German Navy ordered 12 large torpedo boats (Große Torpedoboote) as part of the fiscal year 1909 shipbuilding programme, with two ships (G174 and G175) ordered from Germaniawerft, four (S176–S179) from Schichau-Werke and the remaining six ships (V180–V185) from AG Vulcan. The orders were split between the three shipyards in order to manage the workload and ensure continuous employment at all three companies. The four Schichau torpedo boats closely resembled the four torpedo boats that Schichau had built under the 1908 programme which had been sold to the Ottoman Empire during construction, and their replacements, S165–S168.

S177 was 74.2 metres (243 ft 5 in) long overall and 74.6 metres (244 ft 9 in) at the waterline, with a beam of 7.9 metres (25 ft 11 in) and a draught of 3.10 m (10 ft 2 in). The ship displaced 666 tonnes (655 long tons) design and 781 tonnes (769 long tons) deep load. Three coal-fired and one oil-fired water-tube boilers fed steam at a pressure of 17 atm (250 psi) to two sets of Schichau direct-drive steam turbines. The ship's machinery was rated at 17,600 PS (17,400 shp; 12,900 kW) giving a design speed of 32 knots (59 km/h; 37 mph), with members of the class reaching a speed of 32.9 knots (60.9 km/h; 37.9 mph) during sea trials.

The ship was armed with two 8.8 cm SK L/30 guns, (Note: SK stood for Schnellfeuerkanone (quick-firing gun) or Schnellade-Kanone (fast-loading gun).) (Note: In Imperial German Navy gun nomenclature, the L/30 denotes the length of the gun. In this case, the L/30 gun is 30 caliber, meaning that the gun barrel has an overall length 30 times greater than the gun's bore.) one on the forecastle and one aft. Four single 50 cm (19.7 in) torpedo tubes were fitted, with two on the ship's beam in the gap behind the ship's bridge and fore funnel, and two aft of the second funnel. The ship had a crew of 3 officers and 81 other ranks.

Construction of S177 began at Schichau's Elbing, Prussia (now Elbląg, Poland) shipyard as yard number 840 in 1909. The ship was launched on 21 May 1910 and commissioned on 16 February 1911.

== Service ==
In 1911, S177 was a member of the 12th half-flotilla of the 6th Torpedo Boat Flotilla. The ship remained in this unit through 1912, and in 1913, although the half-flotilla was now in reserve. On 4 March 1913, during training exercises off Helgoland, the torpedoboat S178, another member of the 12th half-flotilla, attempted to cut in front of the armoured cruiser Yorck, but failed, and was rammed by Yorck and quickly sank. Only 15 men were rescued by Yorck, the battleship Oldenburg and S177, with 69 men of S178's crew killed. (Note: S178 was salvaged later that year, repaired, and returned to use.)

=== First World War ===
The Imperial German Navy mobilised on 1 August 1914, owing to the imminent outbreak of the First World War. By 10 August, S177 was a member of the 16th half-flotilla of the 8th Torpedo Boat Flotilla. In October 1914 the 8th Torpedo Boat flotilla, including S177, was temporarily detached to the Baltic Sea as part of a large scale deployment of torpedo boats from both the High Seas Fleet and training units to counter operations of British submarines in the Baltic. The 8th Flotilla returned to the North Sea at the end of the month.

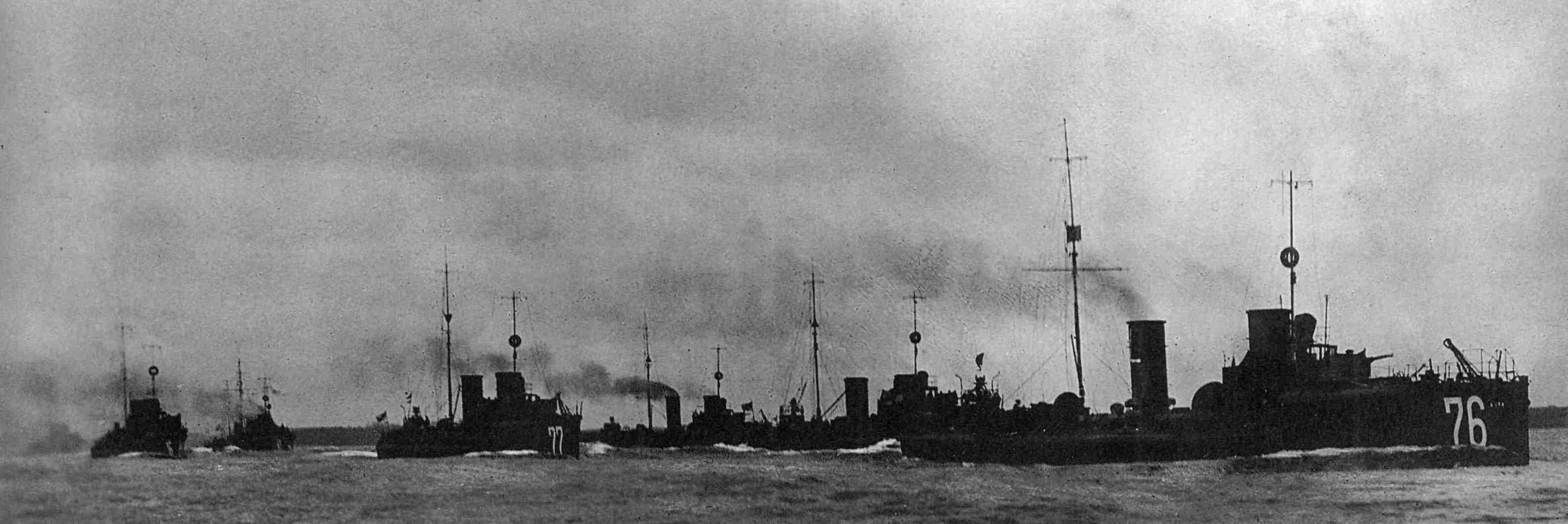
Several German torpedo boats, with SMS S176 and S177 in the foreground

The 8th Torpedo Boat flotilla, including S177, was deployed to the Baltic together with the pre-dreadnought battleships of the IV Battle Squadron as temporary reinforcements in July 1915. On 10–11 July, S177 was part of the escort for a large sortie by battleships and armoured cruisers to the north of Gotland. On 16 July, S177, together with G175 and V180 was sent to search for a ditched aircraft, with the torpedo boats advancing towards Lyserort, Latvia before S177 picked up the missing aircraft. The 8th Torpedo Boat Flotilla continued to operate in the Baltic for the rest of July 1915, and by August that year was formally considered part of the German Baltic Fleet. That month, the German Baltic Fleet, supported by a large portion of the High Seas Fleet, launched a major operation (later called the Battle of the Gulf of Riga) in the Gulf of Riga in support of the advance of German troops. It was planned to enter the gulf via the Irben Strait, defeating any Russian naval forces and mining the entrance to Moon Sound. The 8th Flotilla supported these operations.

On 23 December, the Vorpostenboot (patrol boat) Freya struck a mine and sank between Windau (now Ventspils, Latvia) and Lyserort. S177 and S176 went to the scene in response to radio signals from another Vorpostenboot, and found themselves surrounded by floating mines. Four survivors were picked up from Freya's crew of 26, (rescue attempts were hampered by the low temperatures (−15 °C, 5 °F) which froze the ships' cutters to their decks). On the return journey to Windau, S177 struck a mine and sank, killing 7 of her crew. The same minefield had sunk the German cruiser Bremen and torpedo boat V191 a few days earlier.

== Bibliography ==
- Firle, Rudolph (1921). Der Krieg in der Ostsee: Erster Band: Von Kriegsbeginn bis Mitte März 1915. Der Krieg zur See: 1914–1918 (in German). Berlin: Verlag von E. S. Mittler und Sohn.
- Fock, Harald (1981). Schwarze Gesellen: Band 2: Zerstörer bis 1914 (in German). Herford, Germany: Koelers Verlagsgesellschaft mBH. ISBN 3-7822-0206-6.
- Fock, Harald (1989). Z-Vor! Internationale Entwicklung und Kriegseinsätze von Zerstörern und Torpedobooten 1914 bis 1939 (in German). Herford, Germany: Koehlers Verlagsgesellschaft mBH. ISBN 3-7822-0207-4.
- Friedman, Norman (2011). Naval Weapons of World War One: Guns, Torpedoes, Mines and ASW Weapons of All Nations: An Illustrated Directory. Barnsley, UK: Seaforth Publishing. ISBN 978-1-84832-100-7.
- Gardiner, Robert; Gray, Randal, eds. (1985). Conway's All The World's Fighting Ships 1906–1921. London: Conway Maritime Press. ISBN 0-85177-245-5.
- Gröner, Erich; Jung, Dieter; Maass, Martin (1983). Die deutschen Kriegsschiffe 1815–1945: Band 2: Torpedoboote, Zerstörer, Schnellboote, Minensuchboote, Minenräumboote (in German). Koblenz: Bernard & Graef Verlag. ISBN 3-7637-4801-6.
- Gröner, Erich; Jung, Dieter; Maass, Martin (1990). German Warships 1915–1945: Volume One: Major Surface Vessels. Annapolis, Maryland, US: Naval Institute Press. ISBN 0-87021-790-9.
- Groos, O. (1920). Der Krieg in der Nordsee: Erster Band: Von Kreigsbeginn bis Anfang September 1914. Der Krieg zur See: 1914–1918 (in German). Berlin: Verlag von E. S. Mittler und Sohn – via National Library of Estonia.
- Halpern, Paul G. (1994). A Naval History of World War I. London: UCL Press. ISBN 1-85728-498-4.
- Hildebrand, Hans H.; Röhr, Albert; Steinmetz, Hans-Otto (1982). Die Deutschen Kriegschiffe: Biographen — ein Spiegel der Marinegeschichte von 1815 bis zur Gegenwart: Band 6 (in German). Herford, Germany: Koehlers Verlagsgesellschaft MBH. ISBN 3-7822-0237-6.
- Moore, John (1990). Jane's Fighting Ships of World War I. London: Studio. ISBN 1-85170-378-0.
- Rollmann, Heinrich (1929). Der Krieg in der Ostsee: Zweiter Band: Das Kreigjahr 1915. Der Krieg zur See: 1914–1918 (in German). Berlin: Verlag von E. S. Mittler und Sohn.
