= SMS S35 =

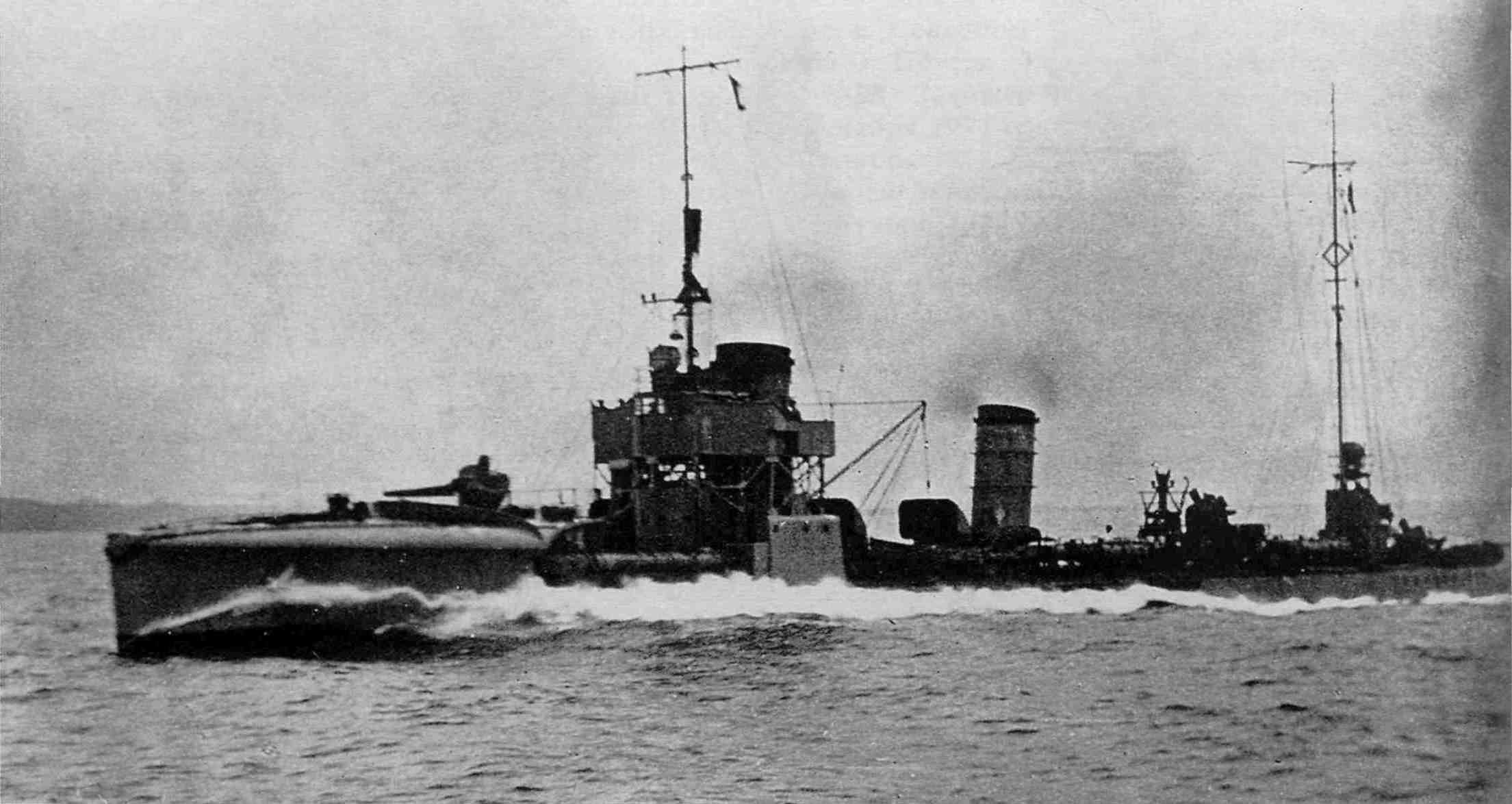
- SMS S56 was the sister ship of SMS S35

History

German Empire
- Name: S35
- Ordered: 1913
- Builder: Schichau-Werke, Elbing
- Launched: 30 August 1914
- Commissioned: 4 December 1914
- Fate: Sunk at Battle of Jutland 31 May 1916

General characteristics
- Displacement: 971 tonnes (956 long tons)
- Length: 79.6 m (261 ft 2 in)
- Beam: 8.3 m (27 ft 3 in)
- Draft: 2.8 m (9 ft 2 in)
- Installed power: 23,500 shp (17,500 kW)
- Propulsion: 3 × water-tube boilers; 2× Steam turbines; 2 shafts
- Speed: 33.5 knots (62.0 km/h; 38.6 mph)
- Range: 1,100 nmi (2,000 km; 1,300 mi) at 20 knots (37 km/h; 23 mph)
- Complement: 83 officers and sailors
- Armament: 3 × 8.8 cm (3.5 in) SK L/45 guns; 6 × 500 mm torpedo tubes; 24 mines

SMS S35 (Note: "SMS" stands for "Seiner Majestät Schiff" ('His Majesty's Ship')) (Note: The "S" in S35 denoted the shipbuilder who constructed her.) was a 1913 Type Large Torpedo Boat (Großes Torpedoboot) of the Imperial German Navy during World War I. She served at the Battle of Jutland where she was sunk by British battleships.

== Construction ==
In 1913, the Imperial German Navy placed orders for 12 high-seas torpedo boats, with a half-flotilla of six ordered from AG Vulcan (V25–V30) and Schichau-Werke (S31–S36). While the designs built by each shipyard were broadly similar, they differed from each other in detail, and were significantly larger and more capable than the small torpedo boats built for the German Navy in the last two years. S35 was one of the six torpedo-boats ordered from the Schichau-Werke.

In June 1914, while still under construction, S35 and sister ship S36 were sold to Greece, but were repossessed by Germany on 10 August 1914, following the outbreak of the First World War. S35 was launched at Schichau's Elbing shipyard on 30 August 1914 and commissioned on 4 December 1914.

S35 was 79.6 metres (261 ft 2 in) long overall and 79.0 metres (259 ft 2 in) at the waterline, with a beam of 8.3 metres (27 ft 3 in) and a draft of 2.8 metres (9 ft 2 in). Displacement was 802 tonnes (789 long tons) normal and 971 tonnes (956 long tons) deep load. Three oil-fired water-tube boilers fed steam to 2 sets of Schichau steam turbines rated at 23,500 shaft horsepower (17,500 kW), giving a speed of 33.5 knots (62.0 km/h; 38.6 mph). 220 tonnes (220 long tons) of fuel oil was carried, giving a range of 1,100 nautical miles (2,000 km; 1,300 mi) at 20 knots (37 km/h; 23 mph).

Armament consisted of three 8.8 cm SK L/45 naval guns in single mounts, together with six 50 cm (19.7 in) torpedo tubes with two fixed single tubes forward and 2 twin mounts aft. Up to 24 mines could be carried. The ship had a complement of 83 officers and men.

== Service ==
On 23 January 1915, a German force of Battlecruisers and light cruisers, escorted by torpedo boats, and commanded by Admiral Franz von Hipper, made a sortie to attack British fishing boats on the Dogger Bank. S35, part of the 18th Torpedo Boat Half-Flotilla, formed part of the escort for Hipper's force. British Naval Intelligence was warned of the raid by radio messages decoded by Room 40, and sent out the Battlecruiser Force from Rosyth, commanded by Admiral Beatty aboard Lion and the Harwich Force of light cruisers and destroyers, to intercept the German force. The British and German Forces met on the morning of 24 January in the Battle of Dogger Bank. On sighting the British, Hipper ordered his ships to head south-east to escape the British, who set off in pursuit. The armoured cruiser Blücher was disabled by British shells and was sunk, but the rest of the German force escaped, with the German battlecruiser Seydlitz the British battlecruiser Lion badly damaged.

S35 took part in the Battle of the Gulf of Riga in August 1915. On 19 August, the torpedo boat S31 was sunk by a mine west of Ruhnu, and boats from S35 and V184 helped to rescue S31's crew.

S35, as part of the 9th Torpedo Boat Flotilla, took part in the Bombardment of Yarmouth and Lowestoft on 24–25 April 1916, where she formed part of the escort for the battlecruisers of the I Scouting Group. At the Battle of Jutland on 31 May – 1 June 1916, S35 was part of the 18th Half-Flotilla, 9th Torpedo Boat Flotilla, again operating in support of the I Scouting Group. The 9th Flotilla, including S35, took part in a torpedo attack on British battlecruisers from about 17:26 CET (16:26 GMT). The attack was disrupted by British destroyers, with the German torpedo boat V29 hit by a torpedo from the British destroyer Petard. S35, along with V26 rescued V29's crew before V29 sank. V27 was disabled by British shells in this clash and was scuttled by gunfire from V26. On the British side, the destroyer Nomad was disabled by a hit in the engine room and later sunk. Later during the day, at about 19:00 CET, the 9th Flotilla attempted another torpedo attack against British battlecruisers, which was curtailed by poor visibility and an attack by British destroyers. From about 20:15 CET (19:15 GMT), S35 took part in a large-scale torpedo attack by the 6th and 9th Torpedo Boat Flotillas on the British fleet in order to cover the outnumbered German battleships' turn to the west. The German torpedo boats came under heavy fire from British battleships, and while S35 fired two torpedoes at the British line, she was hit by two heavy shells, probably from a salvo fired by the battleship Iron Duke's main armament. S35 broke in two and sank killing all 88 of her crew along with the survivors from V29 who were aboard. None of the torpedoes fired by the Germans found their targets, although several narrowly missed British battleships, forcing them to take avoiding action.
