= SMS V29 =

Imperial German Navy torpedo boat

History

German Empire
- Ordered: 1913
- Builder: AG Vulcan, Stettin
- Launched: 18 August 1914
- Commissioned: 19 October 1914
- Fate: Sunk at the Battle of Jutland, 31 May 1916

General characteristics
- Displacement: 975 t (960 long tons)
- Length: 78.5 m (257 ft 7 in)
- Beam: 8.33 m (27 ft 4 in)
- Draft: 3.63 m (11 ft 11 in)
- Installed power: 23,500 PS (23,200 shp; 17,300 kW)
- Propulsion: 3 × water tube boilers; 2 × AEG Vulcan Steam Turbines
- Speed: 33.5 kn (62.0 km/h; 38.6 mph)
- Range: 1,950 nmi (3,610 km; 2,240 mi) at 17 kn (31 km/h; 20 mph)
- Complement: 83 officers and sailors
- Armament: 3 × 8.8 cm (3.5 in) L/45 guns; 6 × 500 mm torpedo tubes; 24 mines

SMS V29 (Note: "SMS" stands for "Seiner Majestät Schiff" (transl. His Majesty's Ship)) (Note: The "V" in V29 denoted the shipbuilder who constructed her, in this case AG Vulcan.) was a V25-class torpedo boat of the Imperial German Navy that served during the First World War. The ship was built by AG Vulcan at Stettin in Prussia (now Szczecin in Poland), and was completed in September 1914. The ship took part in the Battle of Dogger Bank and the Battle of the Gulf of Riga in 1915, and was sunk at the Battle of Jutland on 31 May 1916.

== Construction and design ==
In 1913, the Imperial German Navy decided to build larger and more seaworthy torpedo boats in place of the smaller V1-class torpedo boats that had been ordered in 1911 and 1912, which had not proved successful. The new, larger, designs would, as well as being more seaworthy, carry a heavier armament and would be oil-fueled only, rather than use the mix of oil- and coal-fueled boilers that German torpedo boats had used up to then. As was normal, orders were placed for a flotilla of 12 torpedo boats in the 1913 fiscal year, with 6 each ordered from AG Vulcan (V25–V30) and Schichau-Werke (S31–S36). The two groups of torpedo boats were of basically similar layout but differed in detailed design.

V29 was 78.5 metres (257 ft 7 in) long overall and 77.8 metres (255 ft 3 in) at the waterline, with a beam of 8.33 metres (27 ft 4 in) and a draft of 3.63 metres (11 ft 11 in). Displacement was 812 tonnes (799 long tons) normal and 975 tonnes (960 long tons) deep load. Three oil-fired water-tube boilers fed steam to 2 sets of AEG-Vulcan steam turbines rated at 23,500 metric horsepower (23,200 shp; 17,300 kW), giving a speed of 33.5 knots (62.0 km/h; 38.6 mph). 225 tonnes (221 long tons) of fuel oil was carried, giving a range of 1,080 nautical miles (2,000 km; 1,240 mi) at 20 knots (37 km/h; 23 mph).

Armament consisted of three 8.8 cm SK L/45 naval guns in single mounts, together with six 50 cm (19.7 in) torpedo tubes with two fixed single tubes forward and 2 twin mounts aft. Up to 24 mines could be carried. The ship had a complement of 83 officers and men.

V29 was launched from AG Vulcan's Stettin shipyard on 18 August 1914 and commissioned on 19 October 1914.

== Service ==
On 15 December 1914 the German battlecruiser squadron under the command of Franz von Hipper set out on an attack on the British east coast towns of Scarborough, Hartlepool, West Hartlepool and Whitby, with the intent of drawing out parts of the British Grand Fleet where it could be defeated in detail. V29 was part of the escort for Hipper's heavy ships, but after suffering from condenser problems, was ordered to turn back. On 23 January 1915, a German force of battlecruisers and light cruisers, escorted by torpedo boats, and commanded by Admiral Franz von Hipper, made a sortie to attack British fishing boats on the Dogger Bank. V29, part of the 18th Torpedo Boat Half-Flotilla, formed part of the escort for Hipper's force. British Naval Intelligence was warned of the raid by radio messages decoded by Room 40, and sent out the Battlecruiser Force from Rosyth, commanded by Admiral Beatty aboard HMS Lion and the Harwich Force of light cruisers and destroyers, to intercept the German force. The British and German Forces met on the morning of 24 January in the Battle of Dogger Bank. On sighting the British, Hipper ordered his ships to head south-east to escape the British, who set off in pursuit. The armoured cruiser Blücher was disabled by British shells and was sunk, but the rest of the German force escaped, with the German battlecruiser Seydlitz badly damaged.

On 12 February 1915, five torpedo boats of the 9th Torpedo Boat Flotilla, including V29, were deployed to screen minesweeping operations near the Amrum Bank in the North Sea. When V25 did not return from this operation, a search found wreckage north of Helgoland. At the time it was believed that she had been sunk by a British submarine, with V29 and V27 claiming to have seen and avoided torpedoes, while S33 claimed to have seen a periscope. In fact, no British submarines were in the vicinity, and V25 had probably been sunk by a British mine. All 79 of her crew were lost.

In August 1915, German naval forces in the Baltic Sea, supported by the High Seas Fleet, carried out the Battle of the Gulf of Riga This was an attempt to enter the Gulf of Riga, destroy Russian naval forces in the Gulf and to mine the northern entrances to the Gulf in order to prevent Russian reinforcements. V29 was part of the forces taking part in the battle, sinking a small Russian steamer, the Dagmar. The attempt failed with Germany losing the torpedo boats S31 and V99 and the minesweeper T46, while failing to destroy any major Russian warships or lay the planned minefield.

V29 participated in the Battle of Jutland as part of the 18th Half Flotilla of the 9th Flotilla, in support of the German battlecruisers. The 9th Flotilla, including V29, took part in a torpedo attack on British battlecruisers from about 17:26 CET (16:26 GMT). The attack was disrupted by British destroyers, and V29 was hit in the stern by a torpedo from the British destroyer Petard. V29's bow remained afloat for 30 minutes before sinking, allowing her to launch four torpedoes at the British battle cruisers, while her crew were taken off by the torpedo boats V26 and S35. Later in the day, S35 was sunk by shellfire from the British battleship Iron Duke while attempting another torpedo attack, with all S35's crew killed along with the survivors from V29 who had been taken aboard earlier. (Note: Campbell states 33 of V29's crew were killed and 4 wounded, while Gröner states 43 dead.)

== Bibliography ==
- Campbell, John (1998). Jutland: An Analysis of the Fighting. London: Conway Maritime Press. ISBN 0-85177-750-3.
- Gardiner, Robert; Gray, Randal, eds. (1985). Conway's All The World's Fighting Ships 1906–1921. London: Conway Maritime Press. ISBN 0-85177-245-5.
- Gröner, Erich; Jung, Dieter; Maass, Martin (1983). Die deutschen Kriegsschiffe 1815–1945: Band 2: Torpedoboote, Zerstörer, Schnellboote, Minensuchboote, Minenräumboote (in German). Koblenz: Bernard & Graef Verlag. ISBN 3-7637-4801-6.
- Groos, O. (1923). Der Krieg in der Nordsee: Dritter Band: Von Ende November 1914 bis Unfang Februar 1915. Der Krieg zur See: 1914–1918 (in German). Berlin: Verlag von E. S. Mittler und Sohn – via National Library of Estonia.
- Groos, O. (1924). Der Krieg in der Nordsee: Vierter Band: Von Anfang Februar bis Ende Dezember 1915. Der Krieg zur See: 1914–1918 (in German). Berlin: Verlag von E. S. Mittler und Sohn – via National Library of Estonia.
- Halpern, Paul G. (1994). A Naval History of World War I. London: UCL Press. ISBN 1-85728-498-4.
- Massie, Robert K. (2007). Castles of Steel: Britain, Germany and the Winning of the Great War at Sea. London: Vintage Books. ISBN 978-0-099-52378-9.
- Monograph No. 29: Home Waters—Part IV. From February to July 1915 (PDF). Naval Staff Monographs (Historical). Vol. XIII. The Naval Staff, Training and Staff Duties Division. 1925.
- Rollmann, Heinrich (1929). Der Krieg in der Ostsee: Zweiter Band: Das Kreigjahr 1915. Der Krieg zur See: 1914–1918 (in German). Berlin: Verlag von E. S. Mittler und Sohn.
