= SMS V182 =

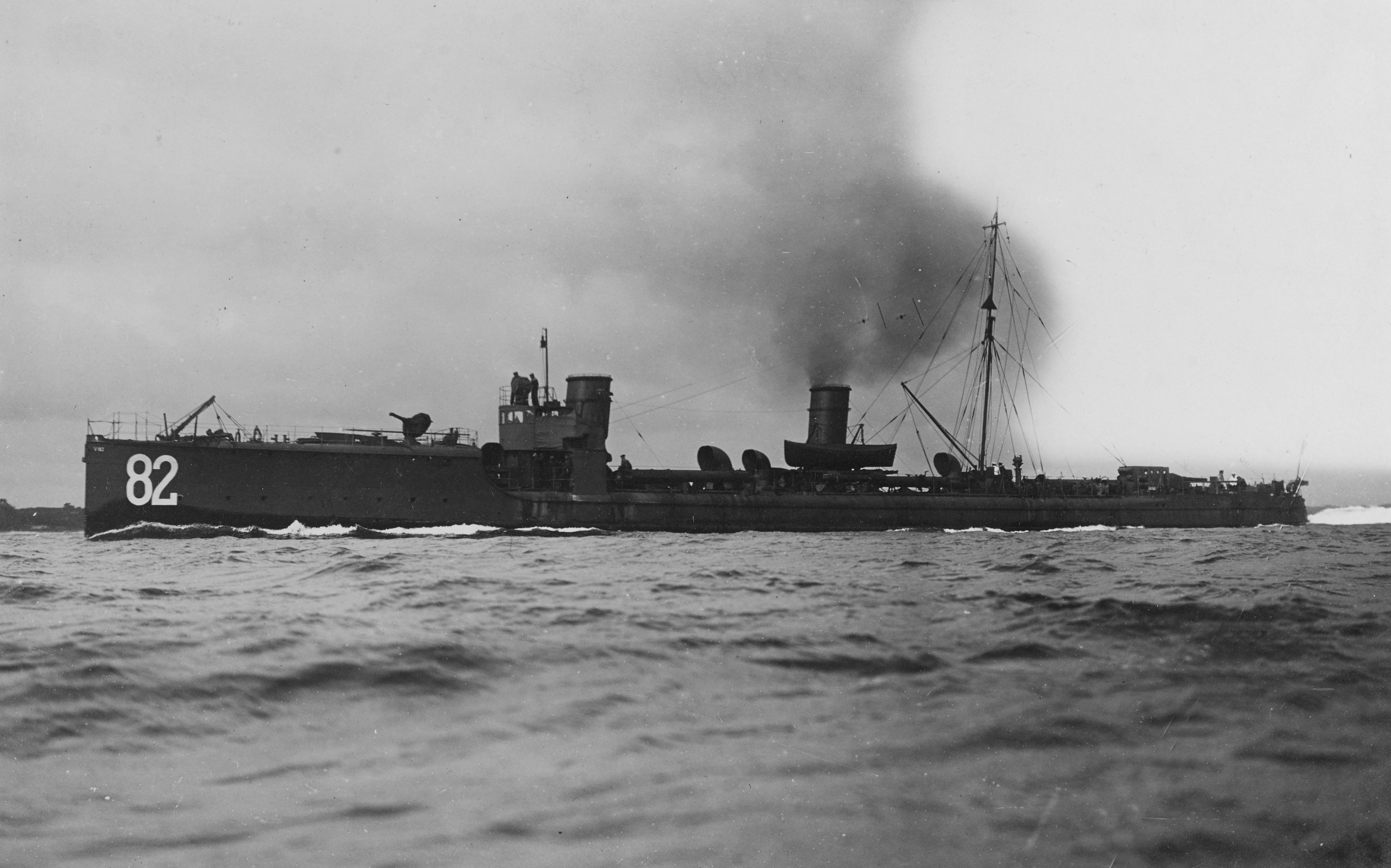

History

Germany
- Name: V182 until 22 February 1918; T182 from 22 February 1918
- Builder: AG Vulcan, Stettin
- Launched: 1 December 1909
- Completed: 4 May 1910
- Fate: Scrapped 1922

General characteristics
- Class & type: S138-class torpedo boat
- Displacement: 650 t (640 long tons) design
- Length: 73.9 m (242 ft 5 in) o/a
- Beam: 7.9 m (25 ft 11 in)
- Draught: 3.07 m (10 ft 1 in)
- Installed power: 18,000 PS (18,000 shp; 13,000 kW)
- Propulsion: 3 × boilers; 2 × steam turbines
- Speed: 32 kn (37 mph; 59 km/h)
- Complement: 84
- Armament: 2× 8.8 cm guns; 4× 50 cm torpedo tubes

SMS V182 (Note: "SMS" stands for "Seiner Majestät Schiff" (transl. His Majesty's Ship)) (Note: The "V" in V182 denoted the shipbuilder who constructed her, in this case AG Vulcan.) was a S-138-class large torpedo boat of the Imperial German Navy. She was built by the AG Vulcan shipyard at Stettin in 1909–1910, launching on 1 December 1909 and completing on 4 May 1910.

V182 took part in the First World War, serving in the North Sea and the Baltic Sea, taking part in actions including the Battle of Dogger Bank and Battle of the Gulf of Riga in 1915 and Operation Albion, the German invasion and occupation of the West Estonian Archipelago in 1917. She was renamed T182 in February 1918 and ended the war as an escort ship in the North Sea.

Following the end of the First World War, T182 was surrendered as a reparation under the terms of the Treaty of Versailles, and was sold for scrap in 1922.

== Construction and design ==
The Imperial German Navy ordered 12 large torpedo boats (Große Torpedoboote) as part of the fiscal year 1909 shipbuilding programme, with two ships (G174 and G175) ordered from Germaniawerft, four (S176–S179) from Schichau-Werke and the remaining six ships (V180–V185) from AG Vulcan. The orders were split between the three shipyards in order to manage the workload and ensure continuous employment at all three companies.

V182 was 73.9 metres (242 ft 5 in) long overall and 73.6 metres (241 ft 6 in) between perpendiculars, with a beam of 7.9 metres (25 ft 11 in) and a draught of 3.07 metres (10 ft 1 in). The ship displaced 650 tonnes (640 long tons) design and 783 tonnes (771 long tons) deep load. Three coal-fired and one oil-fired water-tube boiler fed steam at a pressure of 18.5 standard atmospheres (272 psi) to two sets of AEG-Vulkan direct-drive steam turbines. The ship's machinery was rated at 18,000 PS (18,000 shp; 13,000 kW) giving a design speed of 32 knots (37 mph; 59 km/h), with members of the class reaching a speed of 33.3 knots (38.3 mph; 61.7 km/h) during sea trials.

The ship was armed with two 8.8 cm SK L/45 naval guns, (Note: SK stood for Schnellfeuerkanone (quick-firing gun) or Schnellade-Kanone (fast-loading gun).) (Note: In Imperial German Navy gun nomenclature, the L/35 denotes the length of the gun. In this case, the L/35 gun is 35 caliber, meaning that the gun has an overall length 35 times greater than the gun's bore.) (Note: Conway's All The World's Fighting Ships and Jane's Fighting Ships claim L/30 guns were fitted, while Fock claims the ships were refitted with L/45 guns.) one on the forecastle and one aft. Four single 50 cm (19.7 in) torpedo tubes were fitted, with two on the ship's beam in the gap behind the ship's bridge and fore funnel, and two aft of the second funnel. The ship had a crew of 84 officers and men.

V182 was laid down at AG Vulcan's Stettin shipyard as Yard number 297 and was launched on 1 December 1909 and commissioned on 4 May 1910.

== Service ==
In 1911, V182 was part of the 12th half-flotilla of the 6th Torpedo Boat Flotilla. The ship remained a member of the 12th half-flotilla in 1912, and in 1913, although the half-flotilla was now in reserve.

=== First World War ===
While the German Navy mobilised on 1 August 1914, owing to the imminent outbreak of the First World War, V182 was not immediately brought forward to active service, but by the middle of October, V182 was a member of the 15th half-flotilla of the 8th Torpedo Boat Flotilla, part of the High Seas Fleet.

On 23 January 1915, a German force of battlecruisers and light cruisers, escorted by torpedo boats, and commanded by Admiral Franz von Hipper, made a sortie to attack British fishing boats on the Dogger Bank, with V182 forming part of the escort for Hipper's force. British battlecruisers supported by the Harwich Force of light cruisers and destroyers intercepted the German force on the morning of 24 January in the Battle of Dogger Bank, in which the German armoured cruiser Blücher was sunk and German battlecruiser Seydlitz and the British battlecruiser Lion badly damaged.

On 27 April 1915, the German Army launched an offensive in the Baltic to tie down Russian forces in advance of the start of the Gorlice–Tarnów offensive, with it being decided to capture the port of Libau (now Liepāja). The light cruisers of the 4th Scouting Group, supported by 21 torpedo boats of the 6th and 8th Torpedo Boat Flotillas, including V182, (Note: 6th Torpedo Boat Flotilla: Lead V161, 11th half flotilla (V151, V152, V153, V154 and V155), 12th half flotilla (V156, V157, V158, V159 and V160). 8th Torpedo Boat Flotilla: Lead S178, 14th half flotilla (S19, S20, S22 and S23), 15th half flotilla (V181, V182, V183, V184 and V185).) were sent to the Baltic to support this operation. They were used to prevent interference by the Russian navy with the operations, patrolling between Ösel and Gotska Sandön and between Gotska Sandön and the Swedish coast, while cruisers from the Baltic fleet bombarded Libau. The force returned to the North Sea shortly after the fall of Libau on 8 May. The 8th Torpedo Boat flotilla, including V182 was again deployed to the Baltic in July 1915. V182 took part in a sortie to the north of Gotland on 10–11 July. On 15 July, V182 recovered a German aircraft that had ditched off Steinort (now Gleźnowo, Poland), taking it back to the air base.

In August 1915 the German Baltic Fleet, supported by a large portion of the High Seas Fleet, launched a major operation (later called the Battle of the Gulf of Riga) in the Gulf of Riga in support of the advance of German troops. It was planned to enter the Gulf via the Irben Strait, defeating any Russian naval forces and mining the entrance to Moon Sound. The 8th Flotilla, now listed as part of the Baltic Fleet, took part in this operation. By 20 August, the German forces had finally cleared the Russian minefields in the Irben Strait and were ready to mine Moon Sound, but when V182 sighted a submarine on the planned course of the fleet's advance, the minelaying operation was cancelled. Overall, German forces failed to meet their objectives for the August operations, with the torpedo boats S31 and V99 and the minesweeper T46 being sunk, while no major Russian warships were destroyed and the Germans failed to lay the planned minefield. On 24 November 1915, V182 and G196 were escorting the cruiser Danzig which was carrying a load of 80 mines from Kiel to Libau, when Danzig struck a Russian mine just after passing the Hoburg Shoal, south of Gotland. Danzig was badly damaged, and as the two torpedo boats were unable to take Danzig under tow owing to the heavy seas, the cruiser Berlin towed Danzig back to Neufahrwasser.

V182 remained part of the 15th half flotilla of the 8th Torpedo Boat Flotilla, which was still part of the Baltic Fleet, in May 1916. In October 1917, the Germans carried out Operation Albion, an amphibious assault to capture Ösel and Muhu islands off the coast of Estonia. V182 took part in Operation Albion as part of the 15th half flotilla.

V182 was renamed T182 on 22 February 1918 in order to free up the old number for new construction. The October Revolution in Russia and the subsequent Armistice between Russia and the Central Powers allowed the release of forces from the Baltic to the North Sea, and by the end of April 1918, T182 was part of the 14th half-flotilla of the 7th Torpedo Boat Flotilla of the High Seas Fleet. The need to escort German U-boats through minefields in the German Bight resulted in the formation of large escort flotillas early in 1918, and by the end of the war, T182 had joined the 1st half-flotilla of the 1st Escort Flotilla.

=== Disposal ===
The Armistice of 11 November 1918 resulted in most of the High Seas Fleet being interned at Scapa Flow. T182 was initially retained by Germany, but following the Scuttling of the German fleet at Scapa Flow on 21 June 1919, the terms of Treaty of Versailles required more ships to be surrendered to compensate for the scuttled ships. These additional ships included T182, which was stricken in August 1920. The ship was sold for scrap in February–March 1921 and broken up at Dordrecht in the Netherlands in 1922.

== Bibliography ==
- Chesneau, Roger; Kolesnik, Eugene M., eds. (1979). Conway's All The World's Fighting Ships 1860–1905. London: Conway Maritime Press. ISBN 0-85177-133-5.
- Dodson, Aidan (2019). "Beyond the Kaiser: The IGN's Destroyers and Torpedo Boats After 1918". In Jordan, John (ed.). Warship 2019. Oxford, UK: Osprey Publishing. pp. 129–144. ISBN 978-1-4728-3595-6.
- Fock, Harald (1981). Schwarze Gesellen: Band 2: Zerstörer bis 1914 (in German). Herford, Germany: Koelers Verlagsgesellschaft mBH. ISBN 3-7822-0206-6.
- Fock, Harald (1989). Z-Vor! Internationale Entwicklung und Kriegseinsätze von Zerstörern und Torpedobooten 1914 bis 1939 (in German). Herford, Germany: Koehlers Verlagsgesellschaft mBH. ISBN 3-7822-0207-4.
- Friedman, Norman (2011). Naval Weapons of World War One: Guns, Torpedoes, Mines and ASW Weapons of All Nations: An Illustrated Directory. Barnsley, UK: Seaforth Publishing. ISBN 978-1-84832-100-7.
- von Gagern, Ernst (1962). Der Krieg in der Ostsee: Dritter Band: Von Anfang 1916 bis zum Kriegsende. Der Krieg zur See: 1914–1918 (in German). Frankfurt: Verlag von E.S. Mittler & Sohn.
- Gardiner, Robert; Gray, Randal, eds. (1985). Conway's All The World's Fighting Ships 1906–1921. London: Conway Maritime Press. ISBN 0-85177-245-5.
- Gladisch, Walter, ed. (1965). Der Krieg in der Nordsee: Band 7: Vom Sommer 1917 bis zum Kriegsende 1918. Der Krieg zur See: 1914–1918 (in German). Frankfurt: Verlag E.S. Mittler & Sohn.
- Gröner, Erich; Jung, Dieter; Maass, Martin (1983). Die deutschen Kriegsschiffe 1815–1945: Band 2: Torpedoboote, Zerstörer, Schnellboote, Minensuchboote, Minenräumboote (in German). Koblenz: Bernard & Graef Verlag. ISBN 3-7637-4801-6.
- Gröner, Erich; Jung, Dieter; Maass, Martin (1990). German Warships 1915–1945: Volume One: Major Surface Vessels. Annapolis, Maryland, US: Naval Institute Press. ISBN 0-87021-790-9.
- Groos, O. (1923). Der Krieg in der Nordsee: Dritter Band: Von Ende November 1914 bis Unfang Februar 1915. Der Krieg zur See: 1914–1918 (in German). Berlin: Verlag von E. S. Mittler und Sohn – via National Library of Estonia.
- Halpern, Paul G. (1994). A Naval History of World War I. London: UCL Press. ISBN 1-85728-498-4.
- Massie, Robert K. (2007). Castles of Steel: Britain, Germany and the Winning of the Great War at Sea. London: Vintage Books. ISBN 978-0-099-52378-9.
- Moore, John (1990). Jane's Fighting Ships of World War I. London: Studio. ISBN 1-85170-378-0.
- Rangelist der Kaiserlich Deutschen Marine für Das Jahr 1911 (in German). Berlin: Ernst Siegfried Mittler und Sohn. 1911 – via Heinrich Hein Universität Düsseldorf.
- Rangelist der Kaiserlich Deutschen Marine für Das Jahr 1912 (in German). Berlin: Ernst Siegfried Mittler und Sohn. 1912 – via Heinrich Hein Universität Düsseldorf.
- Rangelist der Kaiserlich Deutschen Marine für Das Jahr 1913 (in German). Berlin: Ernst Siegfried Mittler und Sohn. 1913 – via Heinrich Hein Universität Düsseldorf.
- Rollmann, Heinrich (1929). Der Krieg in der Ostsee: Zweiter Band: Das Kreigjahr 1915. Der Krieg zur See: 1914–1918 (in German). Berlin: Verlag von E. S. Mittler und Sohn.
- Stoelzel, Albert (1930). Ehrenrangliste der Kaiserlich Deutschen Marine 1914–1918 (in German). Berlin: Thormann & Goetsch.
