= SMS V183 =

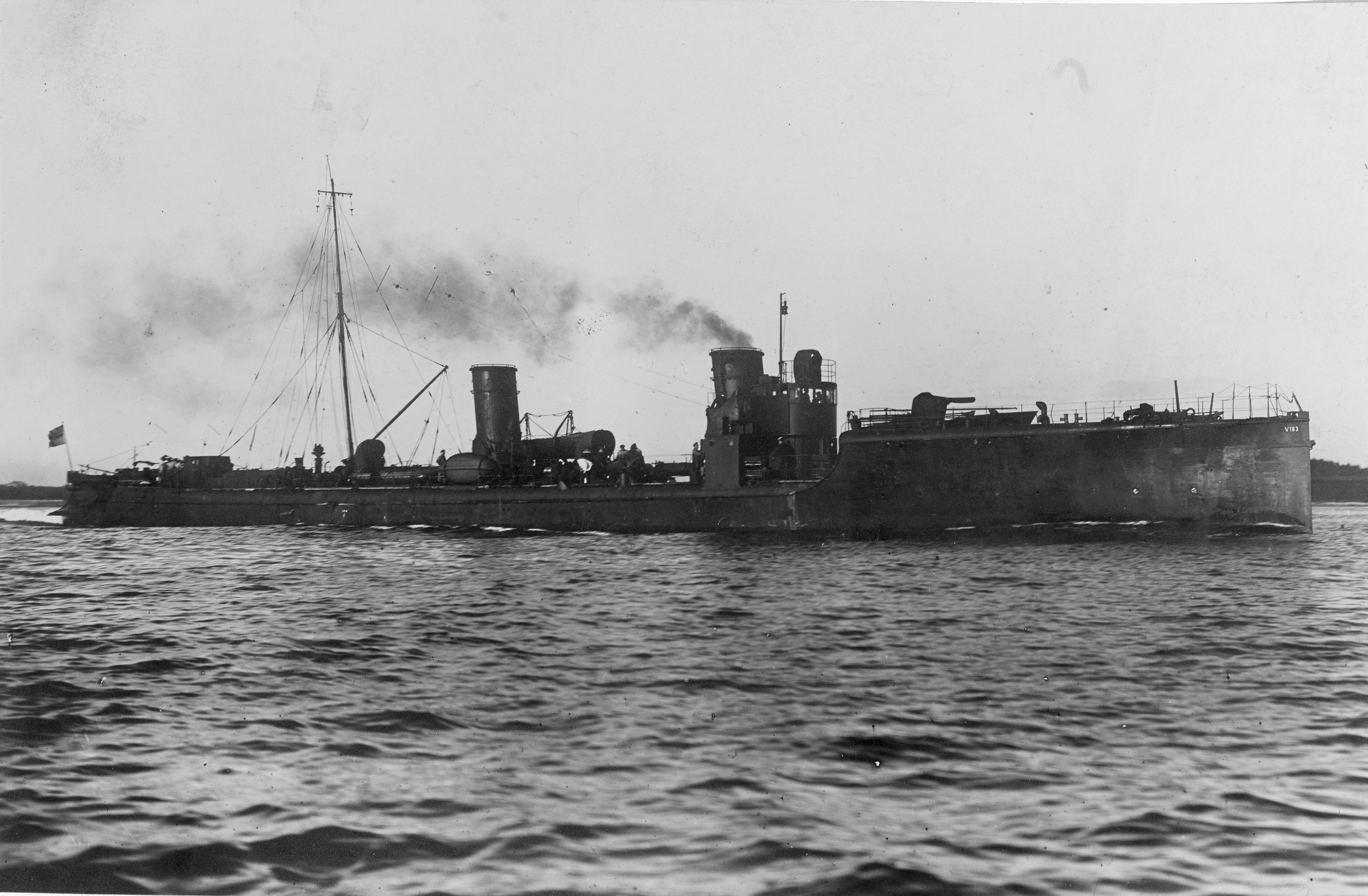

History

Germany
- Name: V183 until 22 February 1918; T183 from 22 February 1918
- Builder: AG Vulcan, Stettin
- Launched: 23 December 1909
- Completed: 12 May 1910
- Fate: Sold for scrap 1921

General characteristics
- Class & type: S138-class torpedo boat
- Displacement: 650 t (640 long tons) design
- Length: 73.9 m (242 ft 5 in) o/a
- Beam: 7.9 m (25 ft 11 in)
- Draught: 3.07 m (10 ft 1 in)
- Installed power: 18,000 PS (18,000 shp; 13,000 kW)
- Propulsion: 3 × boilers; 2 × steam turbines
- Speed: 32 kn (37 mph; 59 km/h)
- Complement: 84
- Armament: 2× 8.8 cm guns; 4× 50 cm torpedo tubes

SMS V183 (Note: "SMS" stands for "Seiner Majestät Schiff" (transl. His Majesty's Ship)) (Note: The "V" in V183 denoted the shipbuilder who constructed her, in this case AG Vulcan.) was a S-138-class large torpedo boat of the Imperial German Navy. She was built by the AG Vulcan shipyard at Stettin in 1909–1910, launching on 12 December 1909 and completing on 12 May 1910.

V183 took part in the First World War, mainly operating in the Baltic Sea, taking part in the Battle of the Gulf of Riga in August 1915 and Operation Albion, the German invasion and occupation of the West Estonian Archipelago in 1917. She was renamed T183 in February 1918, and by the end of the war was operating as an escort ship.

Following the end of the First World War, T183 was surrendered as a reparation under the terms of the Treaty of Versailles, and was sold for scrap in 1921.

== Construction and design ==
The Imperial German Navy ordered 12 large torpedo boats (Große Torpedoboote) as part of the fiscal year 1909 shipbuilding programme, with two ships (G174 and G175) ordered from Germaniawerft, four (S176–S179) from Schichau-Werke and the remaining six ships (V180–V185) from AG Vulcan. The orders were split between the three shipyards in order to manage the workload and ensure continuous employment at all three companies.

V183 was 73.9 metres (242 ft 5 in) long overall and 73.6 metres (241 ft 6 in) between perpendiculars, with a beam of 7.9 metres (25 ft 11 in) and a draught of 3.07 metres (10 ft 1 in). The ship displaced 650 tonnes (640 long tons) design and 783 tonnes (771 long tons) deep load. Three coal-fired and one oil-fired water-tube boiler fed steam at a pressure of 18.5 standard atmospheres (272 psi) to two sets of AEG-Vulkan direct-drive steam turbines. The ship's machinery was rated at 18,000 PS (18,000 shp; 13,000 kW) giving a design speed of 32 knots (37 mph; 59 km/h), with members of the class reaching a speed of 33.3 knots (38.3 mph; 61.7 km/h) during sea trials.

The ship was armed with two 8.8 cm L/45 guns, (Note: Conway's All The World's Fighting Ships and Jane's Fighting Ships claim L/30 guns were fitted, while Fock claims the ships were refitted with L/45 guns.) one on the forecastle and one aft. Four single 50 cm (19.7 in) torpedo tubes were fitted, with two on the ship's beam in the gap behind the ship's bridge and fore funnel, and two aft of the second funnel. The ship had a crew of 84 officers and men.

V183 was laid down at AG Vulcan's Stettin shipyard as Yard number 298 and was launched on 23 December 1909 and completed on 12 May 1910.

== Service ==
In 1911, V183 was the lead boat of the 6th Torpedo Boat Flotilla, which consisted of two half flotillas of five torpedo boats each (the 11th and 12th half flotillas) in addition to V183. V183 remained as lead of the 6th Flotilla in 1912, and in 1913, although the flotilla was now in reserve.

=== First World War ===
While the German Navy mobilised on 1 August 1914, owing to the imminent outbreak of the First World War, V183 was not a member of a torpedo-boat flotilla in the immediate aftermath of the mobilization. By October 1914, V183 was listed as a member of the 15th half flotilla of the 8th Torpedo Boat Flotilla, part of the High Seas Fleet, and in the middle of that month the 8th Torpedo Boat flotilla, including V183, was temporarily detached to the Baltic Sea as part of a large scale deployment of torpedo boats from both the High Seas Fleet and training units to counter operations of British submarines in the Baltic. The 8th Flotilla returned to the North Sea at the end of October 1914.

==== 1915 ====
On 27 April 1915, the German Army launched an offensive in the Baltic to tie down Russian forces in advance of the start of the Gorlice–Tarnów offensive, with it being decided to capture the port of Libau (now Liepāja). The light cruisers of the 4th Scouting Group, supported by 21 torpedo boats of the 6th and 8th Torpedo Boat Flotillas, including V183, (Note: 6th Torpedo Boat Flotilla: Lead V161, 11th half flotilla (V151, V152, V153, V154 and V155), 12th half flotilla (V156, V157, V158, V159 and V160). 8th Torpedo Boat Flotilla: Lead S178, 14th half flotilla (S19, S20, S22 and S23), 15th half flotilla (V181, V182, V183, V184 and V185).) were sent to the Baltic to support this operation. They were used to prevent interference by the Russian navy with the operations, patrolling between Ösel and Gotska Sandön and between Gotska Sandön and the Swedish coast, while cruisers from the Baltic fleet bombarded Libau. The force returned to the North Sea shortly after the fall of Libau on 8 May.

The 8th Torpedo Boat flotilla, including V183 was again deployed to the Baltic in July 1915. V183 took part in a sortie to the north of Gotland on 10–11 July. On 13–14 July, V183 and V180 escorted the cruiser Bremen on a sortie into the Irben Strait. Bremen sighted torpedo tracks twice on the 14th, with the cruiser being narrowly missed on the second occasion. On 17 July, V183 and V181 were on patrol off the Irben Strait when they clashed with four Russian destroyers. The Russian destroyers engaged the German torpedo boats with accurate gunfire at a range of 8,000–9,000 m (8,700–9,800 yd; 5.0–5.6 mi), outranging the German ships, whose guns only had an effective range of 7,100 m (7,800 yd; 4.4 mi). The two German ships attempted to draw the Russian destroyers onto their covering ships, which included the cruiser Bremen and the large B 97-class destroyer V99, but this failed with the Russian destroyers breaking contact after a few minutes.

In August 1915 the German Baltic Fleet, supported by a large portion of the High Seas Fleet, launched a major operation (later called the Battle of the Gulf of Riga) in the Gulf of Riga in support of the advance of German troops. It was planned to enter the Gulf via the Irben Strait, defeating any Russian naval forces and mining the entrance to Moon Sound. The 8th Flotilla, now listed as part of the Baltic Fleet, took part in this operation. On 20 August 1915, V183 took part in one of the last actions of the operation, an attack on Pernau. V183, with the torpedo boats V28, S32 and V108 escorted three blockships to the entrance to the harbour, engaging shore batteries firing on the blockships. After the three blockships were scuttled, V183 laid 12 mines in the harbour entrance, and was hit by a shell which wrecked the ship's radio room and killed two men. Overall, German forces failed to meet their objectives for the August operations, with the torpedo boats S31 and V99 and the minesweeper T46 being sunk, while no major Russian warships were destroyed and the Germans failed to lay the planned minefield.

==== 1916–1918 ====
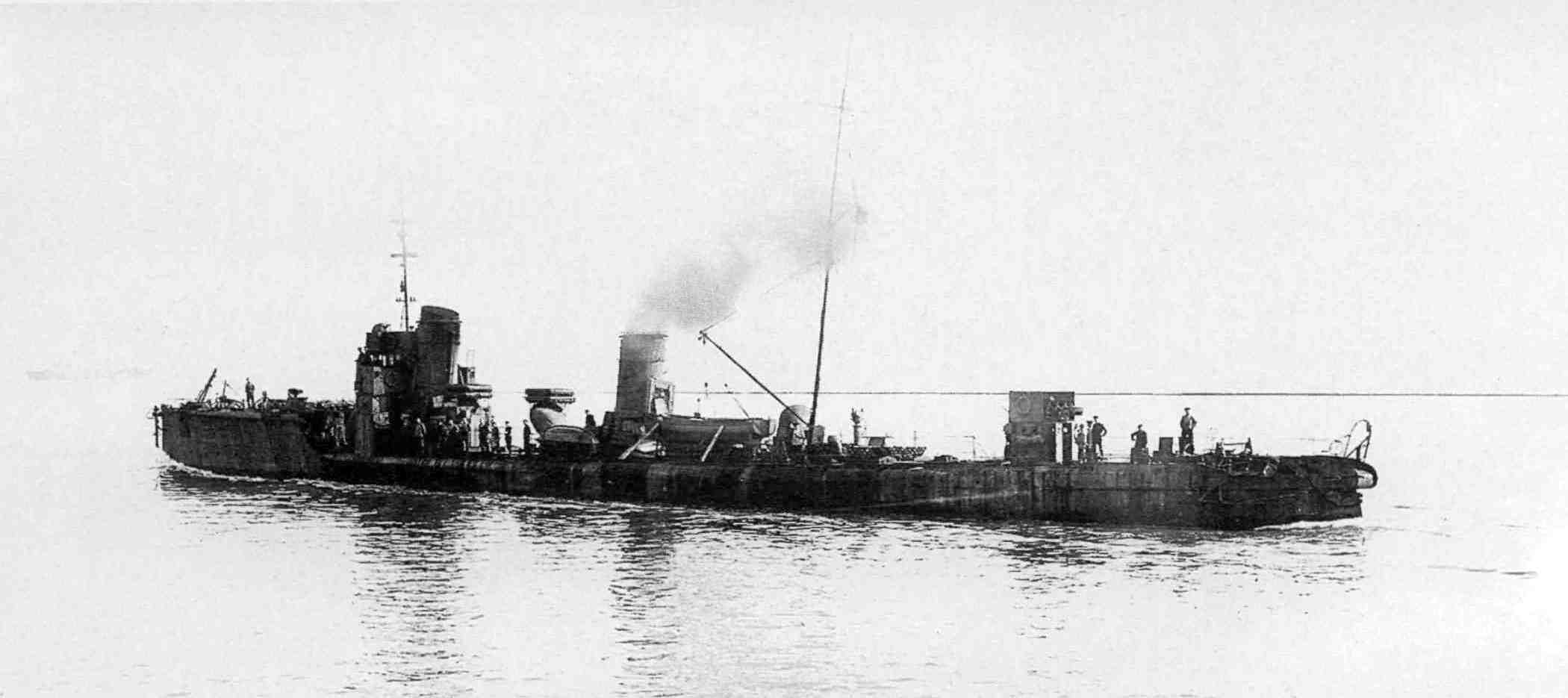
T183

V183 remained part of the 15th half flotilla of the 8th Torpedo Boat Flotilla, which was still part of the Baltic Fleet, in May 1916. In October 1917, the Germans carried out Operation Albion, an amphibious assault to capture Ösel and Muhu islands off the coast of Estonia. V183 took part in Operation Albion as part of the 15th half flotilla.

On 22 February 1918, V183 was renamed T183 in order to free up her name for new construction. On 10 March 1918, T183, now a member of the 10th half flotilla of the 5th Torpedo Boat Flotilla, and part of the High Seas Fleet, helped escort a force of cruisers and torpedo boats that were on a sortie against merchant shipping in the Skagerrak and Kattegat through minefields in the German Bight, deploying sweeps while passing through the minefields. By the end of the war, T183 had transferred to an escort flotilla, serving in the 1st half flotilla of the 1st Escort Flotilla.

=== Disposal ===
After the end of the war, T183 initially remained under the control of the Weimar Republic, but after the scuttling of the German fleet at Scapa Flow on 21 June 1919, was surrendered under the terms of Treaty of Versailles to compensate for the scuttled ships. T183 was not allocated to any of the victors of the war for operational or target duties, and was sold for scrap in early 1921 at Rosyth.

== Bibliography ==
- Chesneau, Roger; Kolesnik, Eugene M., eds. (1979). Conway's All The World's Fighting Ships 1860–1905. London: Conway Maritime Press. ISBN 0-85177-133-5.
- Dodson, Aidan (2019). "Beyond the Kaiser: The IGN's Destroyers and Torpedo Boats After 1918". In Jordan, John (ed.). Warship 2019. Oxford, UK: Osprey Publishing. pp. 129–144. ISBN 978-1-4728-3595-6.
- Firle, Rudolph (1921). Der Krieg in der Ostsee: Erster Band: Von Kriegsbeginn bis Mitte März 1915. Der Krieg zur See: 1914–1918 (in German). Berlin: Verlag von E. S. Mittler und Sohn.
- Fock, Harald (1981). Schwarze Gesellen: Band 2: Zerstörer bis 1914 (in German). Herford, Germany: Koelers Verlagsgesellschaft mBH. ISBN 3-7822-0206-6.
- Fock, Harald (1989). Z-Vor! Internationale Entwicklung und Kriegseinsätze von Zerstörern und Torpedobooten 1914 bis 1939 (in German). Herford, Germany: Koehlers Verlagsgesellschaft mBH. ISBN 3-7822-0207-4.
- von Gagern, Ernst (1962). Der Krieg in der Ostsee: Dritter Band: Von Anfang 1916 bis zum Kriegsende. Der Krieg zur See: 1914–1918 (in German). Frankfurt: Verlag von E.S. Mittler & Sohn.
- Gardiner, Robert; Gray, Randal, eds. (1985). Conway's All The World's Fighting Ships 1906–1921. London: Conway Maritime Press. ISBN 0-85177-245-5.
- Gladisch, Walter, ed. (1965). Der Krieg in der Nordsee: Band 7: Vom Sommer 1917 bis zum Kriegsende 1918. Der Krieg zur See: 1914–1918. Frankfurt: Verlag E.S. Mittler & Sohn.
- Gröner, Erich; Jung, Dieter; Maass, Martin (1983). Die deutschen Kriegsschiffe 1815–1945: Band 2: Torpedoboote, Zerstörer, Schnellboote, Minensuchboote, Minenräumboote (in German). Koblenz: Bernard & Graef Verlag. ISBN 3-7637-4801-6.
- Halpern, Paul G. (1994). A Naval History of World War I. London: UCL Press. ISBN 1-85728-498-4.
- Moore, John (1990). Jane's Fighting Ships of World War I. London: Studio. ISBN 1-85170-378-0.
- Rollmann, Heinrich (1929). Der Krieg in der Ostsee: Zweiter Band: Das Kreigjahr 1915. Der Krieg zur See: 1914–1918 (in German). Berlin: Verlag von E. S. Mittler und Sohn.
- Stoelzel, Albert (1930). Ehrenrangliste der Kaiserlich Deutschen Marine 1914–1918 (in German). Berlin: Thormann & Goetsch.
