= SMS V184 =

History

Germany
- Name: V184 until 22 February 1918; T184 from 22 February 1918
- Builder: AG Vulcan, Stettin
- Launched: 26 February 1910
- Completed: 29 June 1910
- Fate: Scrapped 1922

General characteristics
- Class & type: S138-class torpedo boat
- Displacement: 650 t (640 long tons) design
- Length: 73.9 m (242 ft 5 in) o/a
- Beam: 7.9 m (25 ft 11 in)
- Draught: 3.07 m (10 ft 1 in)
- Installed power: 18,000 PS (18,000 shp; 13,000 kW)
- Propulsion: 3 × boilers; 2 × steam turbines
- Speed: 32 kn (37 mph; 59 km/h)
- Complement: 84
- Armament: 2× 8.8 cm guns; 4× 50 cm torpedo tubes

SMS V184 (Note: "SMS" stands for "Seiner Majestät Schiff" (transl. His Majesty's Ship)) (Note: The "V" in V184 denoted the shipbuilder who constructed her, in this case AG Vulcan.) was a S-138-class large torpedo boat of the Imperial German Navy. She was built by the AG Vulcan shipyard at Stettin in 1909–1910, launching on 26 February 1910 and completing on 29 June 1910.

V184 took part in the First World War, serving in the North Sea and the Baltic Sea, taking part in actions including the Battle of the Gulf of Riga in 1915 and Operation Albion, the German invasion and occupation of the West Estonian Archipelago in 1917. She was renamed T184 in February 1918 and ended the war as a leader of a minesweeping flotilla in the North Sea.

Following the end of the First World War, T184 was surrendered as a reparation under the terms of the Treaty of Versailles, and was sold for scrap in 1922.

== Construction and design ==
The Imperial German Navy ordered 12 large torpedo boats (Große Torpedoboote) as part of the fiscal year 1909 shipbuilding programme, with two ships (G174 and G175) ordered from Germaniawerft, four (S176–S179) from Schichau-Werke and the remaining six ships (V180–V185) from AG Vulcan. The orders were split between the three shipyards in order to manage the workload and ensure continuous employment at all three companies.

V184 was 73.9 metres (242 ft 5 in) long overall and 73.6 metres (241 ft 6 in) between perpendiculars, with a beam of 7.9 metres (25 ft 11 in) and a draught of 3.07 metres (10 ft 1 in). The ship displaced 650 tonnes (640 long tons) design and 783 tonnes (771 long tons) deep load. Three coal-fired and one oil-fired water-tube boiler fed steam at a pressure of 18.5 standard atmospheres (272 psi) to two sets of AEG-Vulkan direct-drive steam turbines. The ship's machinery was rated at 18,000 PS (18,000 shp; 13,000 kW) giving a design speed of 32 knots (37 mph; 59 km/h), with members of the class reaching a speed of 33.3 knots (38.3 mph; 61.7 km/h) during sea trials.

The ship was armed with two 8.8 cm SK L/45 naval guns, (Note: SK stood for Schnellfeuerkanone (quick-firing gun) or Schnellade-Kanone (fast-loading gun).) (Note: In Imperial German Navy gun nomenclature, the L/35 denotes the length of the gun. In this case, the L/35 gun is 35 caliber, meaning that the gun has an overall length 35 times greater than the gun's bore.) (Note: Conway's All The World's Fighting Ships and Jane's Fighting Ships claim L/30 guns were fitted, while Fock claims the ships were refitted with L/45 guns.) one on the forecastle and one aft. Four single 50 cm (19.7 in) torpedo tubes were fitted, with two on the ship's beam in the gap behind the ship's bridge and fore funnel, and two aft of the second funnel. The ship had a crew of 84 officers and men.

V184 was laid down at AG Vulcan's Stettin shipyard as Yard number 299 and was launched on 26 February 1910. The ship was commissioned on 29 June 1910.

== Service ==
In 1911, V184 was part of the 12th half-flotilla of the 6th Torpedo Boat Flotilla. The ship remained a member of the 12th half-flotilla in 1912, and in 1913, although the half-flotilla was now in reserve.

=== First World War ===
While the German Navy mobilised on 1 August 1914, owing to the imminent outbreak of the First World War, V184 was not immediately brought forward to active service. On 27 April 1915, the German Army launched an offensive in the Baltic to tie down Russian forces in advance of the start of the Gorlice–Tarnów offensive, with it being decided to capture the port of Libau (now Liepāja). The light cruisers of the 4th Scouting Group, supported by 21 torpedo boats of the 6th and 8th Torpedo Boat Flotillas, including V184, which was now part of the 15th half flotilla of the 8th Torpedo Boat Flotilla, (Note: 6th Torpedo Boat Flotilla: Lead V161, 11th half flotilla (V151, V152, V153, V154 and V155), 12th half flotilla (V156, V157, V158, V159 and V160). 8th Torpedo Boat Flotilla: Lead S178, 14th half flotilla (S19, S20, S22 and S23), 15th half flotilla (V181, V182, V183, V184 and V185).) were sent to the Baltic to support this operation. They were used to prevent interference by the Russian navy with the operations, patrolling between Ösel and Gotska Sandön and between Gotska Sandön and the Swedish coast, while cruisers from the Baltic fleet bombarded Libau. The force returned to the North Sea shortly after the fall of Libau on 8 May. The 8th Torpedo Boat flotilla, including V184, was again deployed to the Baltic in July 1915. On 10–11 July, V184 took part in a sortie north of Gotland, with the 8th Torpedo Boat flotilla accompanying the pre-dreadnought battleships of the IV Battle Squadron and cruisers of the Baltic fleet. On 1–2 August 1915, V184 took part in a sortie of the 8th Flotilla west of Libau (now Liepāja).

In August 1915 the German Baltic Fleet, supported by a large portion of the High Seas Fleet, launched a major operation (later called the Battle of the Gulf of Riga) in the Gulf of Riga in support of the advance of German troops. It was planned to enter the Gulf via the Irben Strait, defeating any Russian naval forces and mining the entrance to Moon Sound. The 8th Flotilla, now listed as part of the Baltic Fleet, took part in this operation. On 19 August 1915, the torpedo boat S31 struck a mine west of the island of Ruhnu. Boats from V184 and S35 picked up three men who had been blown overboard by the explosion, and when S31 finally sank two and a half hours later, the two torpedo boats rescued the survivors, with 11 men having been killed in the initial explosion.

V184 remained part of the 15th half flotilla of the 8th Torpedo Boat Flotilla, (Note: V181, V182, V183, V184 and V185.) which was still part of the Baltic Fleet, in May 1916. In 1916, the German naval forces in the Baltic were mainly used for defensive purposes, laying minefields to constrain the Russian navy and protecting merchant shipping from attacks from submarines and surface ships. On the night of 29–30 June 1916, five torpedo boats of the 15th half flotilla, and three more modern torpedo boats of the 20th half flotilla, encountered the large Russian destroyers Grom, Orfey and Pobeditel, which were attempting to intercept a German convoy, off Norrköping. The outnumbered Russian destroyers turned away with the German torpedo boats in pursuit, until they encountered the Russian covering force of the cruisers Gromoboi and Diana and the destroyers Okhotnik, General Kondratenko, Emir Bukharsky, Dobrovolets and Moskvitianin. The German torpedo boats launched a torpedo attack against the Russian ships, while the Russian cruisers replied with heavy and accurate gunfire, before the Germans broke away under cover of a smokescreen. No ships on either side were damaged.

In October 1917, the Germans carried out Operation Albion, an amphibious assault to capture Ösel and Muhu islands off the coast of Estonia. V184 took part in Operation Albion as part of the 15th half flotilla. On 18 October, V184 and V180 accompanied the minesweepers of the 3rd minesweeping half-flotilla as they progressed northwards up the southern part of Moon Sound (now Väinameri) towards Kuivastu. They spotted the Russian destroyers Zaibaikalets and Sil'nyi, which were laying mines. The two German torpedo boats opened fire, and set off in pursuit of the two Russian destroyers, which were withdrawing northwards. They then encountered two more Russian destroyers, General Kondratenko and Pogranichnik and the gunboat Chivinetz, which had been escorting ships evacuating troops from Muhu. The Russian warships advanced southwards, and engaged V184 and V180 with heavy fire, causing the two German torpedo boats to withdraw southwards under the cover of a smokescreen. The encounter caused the evacuation of Russian troops from Muhu to be stopped.

On 22 February 1918, V184 was renamed T184 in order to free up her name for new construction, in this case the 1918 Mobilisation type S184, which was laid down but never completed. The October Revolution in Russia and the subsequent Armistice between Russia and the Central Powers allowed the release of forces from the Baltic to the North Sea, and on 10 March, T184 helped to escort a force of cruisers and torpedo boats that were on a sortie against merchant shipping in the Skagerrak and Kattegat through minefields in the German Bight, deploying sweeps while passing through the minefields. T184 was later assigned as leader for the 1st Minesweeping Flotilla, remaining in this role at the end of the war.

=== Disposal ===
After the end of the war, T184 initially remained under the control of the Weimar Republic, but after the scuttling of the German fleet at Scapa Flow on 21 June 1919, the terms of Treaty of Versailles required more ships to be surrendered to compensate for the scuttled ships. These additional ships included T184, which was stricken in August 1920 and allocated to Britain for disposal. T184 was sold for scrap in early 1921 at Rosyth.

== Bibliography ==
- Chesneau, Roger; Kolesnik, Eugene M., eds. (1979). Conway's All The World's Fighting Ships 1860–1905. London: Conway Maritime Press. ISBN 0-85177-133-5.
- Dodson, Aidan (2019). "Beyond the Kaiser: The IGN's Destroyers and Torpedo Boats After 1918". In Jordan, John (ed.). Warship 2019. Oxford, UK: Osprey Publishing. pp. 129–144. ISBN 978-1-4728-3595-6.
- Fock, Harald (1981). Schwarze Gesellen: Band 2: Zerstörer bis 1914 (in German). Herford, Germany: Koelers Verlagsgesellschaft mBH. ISBN 3-7822-0206-6.
- Fock, Harald (1989). Z-Vor! Internationale Entwicklung und Kriegseinsätze von Zerstörern und Torpedobooten 1914 bis 1939 (in German). Herford, Germany: Koehlers Verlagsgesellschaft mBH. ISBN 3-7822-0207-4.
- Friedman, Norman (2011). Naval Weapons of World War One: Guns, Torpedoes, Mines and ASW Weapons of All Nations: An Illustrated Directory. Barnsley, UK: Seaforth Publishing. ISBN 978-1-84832-100-7.
- von Gagern, Ernst (1962). Der Krieg in der Ostsee: Dritter Band: Von Anfang 1916 bis zum Kriegsende. Der Krieg zur See: 1914–1918 (in German). Frankfurt: Verlag von E.S. Mittler & Sohn.
- Gardiner, Robert; Gray, Randal, eds. (1985). Conway's All The World's Fighting Ships 1906–1921. London: Conway Maritime Press. ISBN 0-85177-245-5.
- Gladisch, Walter, ed. (1965). Der Krieg in der Nordsee: Band 7: Vom Sommer 1917 bis zum Kriegsende 1918. Der Krieg zur See: 1914–1918. Frankfurt: Verlag E.S. Mittler & Sohn.
- Gröner, Erich; Jung, Dieter; Maass, Martin (1983). Die deutschen Kriegsschiffe 1815–1945: Band 2: Torpedoboote, Zerstörer, Schnellboote, Minensuchboote, Minenräumboote (in German). Koblenz: Bernard & Graef Verlag. ISBN 3-7637-4801-6.
- Gröner, Erich; Jung, Dieter; Maass, Martin (1990). German Warships 1915–1945: Volume One: Major Surface Vessels. Annapolis, Maryland, US: Naval Institute Press. ISBN 0-87021-790-9.
- Halpern, Paul G. (1994). A Naval History of World War I. London: UCL Press. ISBN 1-85728-498-4.
- Moore, John (1990). Jane's Fighting Ships of World War I. London: Studio. ISBN 1-85170-378-0.
- Pavlovich, N. B. (1979) [First published 1964, Moscow]. The Fleet in the First World War: Volume I: Operations of the Russian Fleet. New Delhi: Amerind Publishing Co. Pvt. Ltd.
- Rangelist der Kaiserlich Deutschen Marine für Das Jahr 1911 (in German). Berlin: Ernst Siegfried Mittler und Sohn. 1911 – via Heinrich Hein Universität Düsseldorf.
- Rangelist der Kaiserlich Deutschen Marine für Das Jahr 1912 (in German). Berlin: Ernst Siegfried Mittler und Sohn. 1912 – via Heinrich Hein Universität Düsseldorf.
- Rangelist der Kaiserlich Deutschen Marine für Das Jahr 1913 (in German). Berlin: Ernst Siegfried Mittler und Sohn. 1913 – via Heinrich Hein Universität Düsseldorf.
- Rollmann, Heinrich (1929). Der Krieg in der Ostsee: Zweiter Band: Das Kreigjahr 1915. Der Krieg zur See: 1914–1918 (in German). Berlin: Verlag von E. S. Mittler und Sohn.
- Staff, Gary (2008). Battle for the Baltic Islands 1917: Triumph of the Imperial German Navy. Barnsley, UK: Pen & Sword Maritime. ISBN 9781783033188.
- Stoelzel, Albert (1930). Ehrenrangliste der Kaiserlich Deutschen Marine 1914–1918 (in German). Berlin: Thormann & Goetsch.
