= SMS S31 =

Two torpedo boats of the Imperial German Navy, both built by Schichau-Werke at their Elbing shipyard have been named SMS S31:

- SMS S31 (1886), launched in 1886, was a small S7-class torpedo boat. She was renamed T31 in 1910 and was sold for scrap in 1920.
- SMS S31 (1913), launched in 1913, was a V25-class torpedo boat . She was sunk on 19 October 1915 after being mined during the Battle of the Gulf of Riga.
