= SMS S23 =

SMS S23 refers to two torpedo boats built by the German Kaiserliche Marine (Imperial Navy):

- SMS S23 (1885), a S7-class torpedo boat launched on 10 October 1885, and sold in 1905.
- SMS S23 (1913), a V1-class torpedo boat launched in 1913, renamed T23 in 1932, again renamed T123 in 1939, and converted to control ship for radio-controlled target ships in 1939, being renamed Komet. Ceded to the Soviet Union in 1946.
