= Ehrhard Schmidt =

German navy admiral

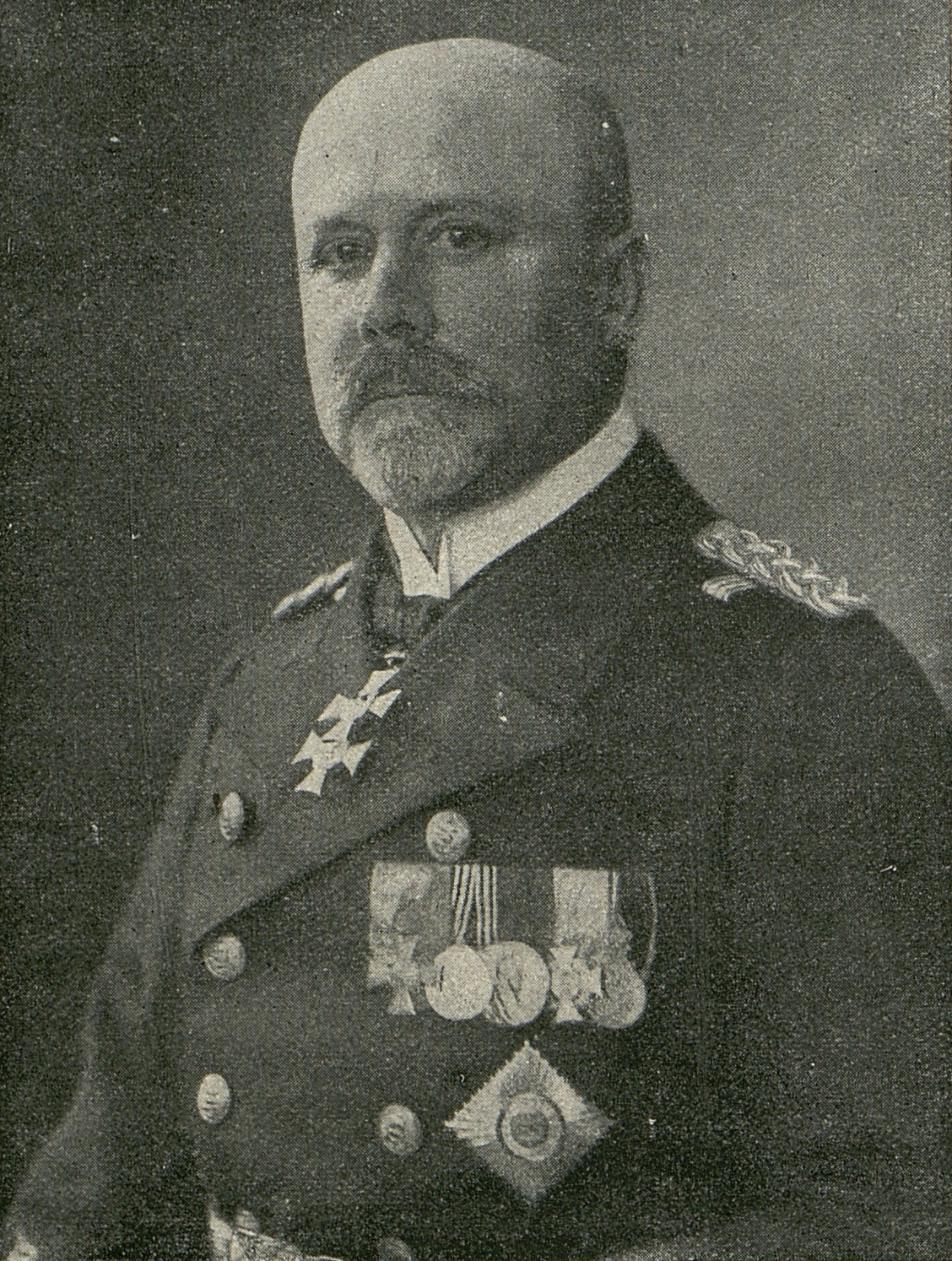
- Vice Admiral Erhard Schmidt (c. 1917)
- Born: 18 May 1863; Offenbach am Main, Grand Duchy of Hesse
- Died: 18 July 1946 (aged 83); Aschau am Inn, Germany
- Military career
- Allegiance: German Empire
- Branch: Imperial German Navy
- Service years: 1878–1918
- Rank: Admiral
- Awards: Pour le Mérite

Ehrhard Schmidt (18 May 1863 – 18 July 1946) was an admiral of the Kaiserliche Marine (Imperial German Navy) during World War I.

== Career ==
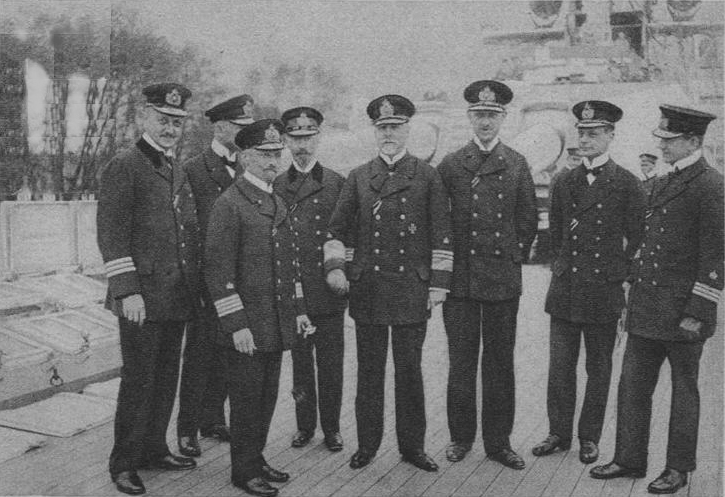
Ehrhard Schmidt (centre) and his staff

At age 15, he entered the navy and saw service at several branches at sea and on land. Among them were posts on missions, as a commanding officer and in cadet training. His wish to become commander of a ship was granted in 1901 when he assumed command of the armoured cruiser Prinz Adalbert. He held that command until 1907. From 1908 to 1910, he commanded the Braunschweig-class battleship Hessen and was afterwards promoted to Konteradmiral to command the II Squadron of the High Seas Fleet. Later he was commander of the naval artillery.

At the beginning of World War I, he was commander of the IV Squadron, made up of old Wittelsbach-class ships. During the Battle of Jutland, Schmidt commanded the I Squadron and used it as a vanguard to break through the British lines at night. In 1917, he led Operation Albion, a special task force for the occupation of the Baltic Sea islands of Saaremaa and Hiiumaa off the Estonian coast. For his achievements he was awarded the Pour le Mérite order. Upon his request, he was retired in 1918 with the rank of Admiral à la Suite, and following the Great War, he, like many of his former comrades of similar age, did not join the Reichsmarine. He remained loyal to the spirit of the Imperial Navy.

Apart from his nomination as Honorary Chairman of the Munich Naval Association (Marineverein München), he was appointed the Honorary Leader of the Gau of Bavaria.
