= SMS V180 =

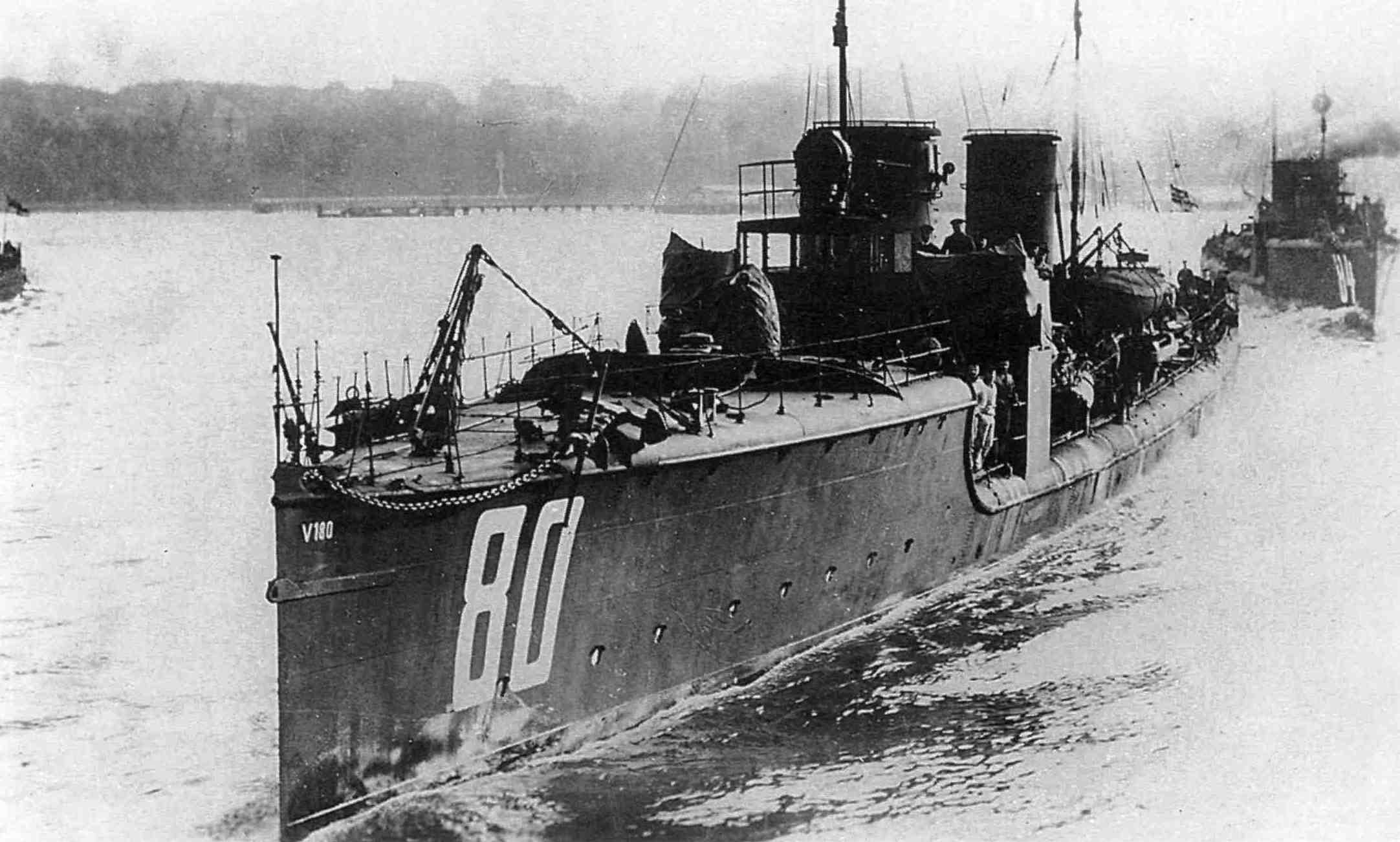

History

Germany
- Name: V180 until 22 February 1918; T180 from 22 February 1918
- Builder: AG Vulcan, Stettin
- Launched: 15 October 1909
- Completed: 4 January 1910
- Fate: Sold for scrap 1921

General characteristics
- Class & type: S138-class torpedo boat
- Displacement: 650 t (640 long tons) design
- Length: 73.9 m (242 ft 5 in) o/a
- Beam: 7.9 m (25 ft 11 in)
- Draught: 3.07 m (10 ft 1 in)
- Installed power: 18,000 PS (18,000 shp; 13,000 kW)
- Propulsion: 3 × boilers; 2 × steam turbines
- Speed: 32 kn (37 mph; 59 km/h)
- Complement: 84
- Armament: 2× 8.8 cm guns; 4× 50 cm torpedo tubes

SMS V180 (Note: "SMS" stands for "Seiner Majestät Schiff" (transl. His Majesty's Ship)) (Note: The "V" in V180 denoted the shipbuilder who constructed her, in this case AG Vulcan.) was a S-138-class large torpedo boat of the Imperial German Navy. She was built by the AG Vulcan shipyard at Stettin in 1909–1910, launching on 15 October 1909 and completing on 4 January 1910.

V180 took part in the First World War, serving in the North Sea and the Baltic Sea, taking part in the Battle of the Gulf of Riga in August 1915 and Operation Albion, the German invasion and occupation of the West Estonian Archipelago in 1917. She was renamed T180 in February 1918.

Following the end of the First World War, T180 was surrendered as a reparation under the terms of the Treaty of Versailles, and was sold for scrap in 1921.

== Construction and design ==
The Imperial German Navy ordered 12 large torpedo boats (Große Torpedoboote) as part of the fiscal year 1909 shipbuilding programme, with two ships (G174 and G175) ordered from Germaniawerft, four (S176–S179) from Schichau-Werke and the remaining six ships (V180–V185) from AG Vulcan. The orders were split between the three shipyards in order to manage the workload and ensure continuous employment at all three companies.

V180 was 73.9 metres (242 ft 5 in) long overall and 73.6 metres (241 ft 6 in) between perpendiculars, with a beam of 7.9 metres (25 ft 11 in) and a draught of 3.07 metres (10 ft 1 in). The ship displaced 650 tonnes (640 long tons) design and 783 tonnes (771 long tons) deep load. Three coal-fired and one oil-fired water-tube boilers fed steam at a pressure of 18.5 standard atmospheres (272 psi) to two sets of AEG-Vulkan direct-drive steam turbines. The ship's machinery was rated at 18,000 PS (18,000 shp; 13,000 kW) giving a design speed of 32 knots (37 mph; 59 km/h), with members of the class reaching a speed of 33.3 knots (38.3 mph; 61.7 km/h) during sea trials.

The ship was armed with two 8.8 cm SK L/45 naval guns, (Note: SK stood for Schnellfeuerkanone (quick-firing gun) or Schnellade-Kanone (fast-loading gun).) (Note: In Imperial German Navy gun nomenclature, the L/35 denotes the length of the gun. In this case, the L/35 gun is 35 caliber, meaning that the gun has an overall length 35 times greater than the gun's bore.) (Note: Conway's All The World's Fighting Ships and Jane's Fighting Ships claim L/30 guns were fitted, while Fock claims the ships were refitted with L/45 guns.) one on the forecastle and one aft. Four single 50 cm (19.7 in) torpedo tubes were fitted, with two on the ship's beam in the gap behind the ship's bridge and fore funnel, and two aft of the second funnel. The ship had a crew of 84 officers and men.

V180 was laid down at AG Vulcan's Stettin shipyard as Yard number 295 and was launched on 15 October 1909 and commissioned on 4 January 1910.

== Service ==
In 1911, V180 was part of the 12th half-flotilla of the 6th Torpedo Boat Flotilla. The ship remained a member of the 12th half-flotilla in 1912, and in 1913, although the half-flotilla was now in reserve.

=== First World War ===
While the German Navy mobilised on 1 August 1914, owing to the imminent outbreak of the First World War, V180 was not a member of a torpedo-boat flotilla in the immediate aftermath of the mobilization. By October 1914, V180 was listed as a member of the 15th half-flotilla of the 8th Torpedo Boat Flotilla, part of the High Seas Fleet, and in the middle of that month the 8th Torpedo Boat flotilla, including V180, was temporarily detached to the Baltic Sea as part of a large scale deployment of torpedo boats from both the High Seas Fleet and training units to counter operations of British submarines in the Baltic. The 8th Flotilla returned to the North Sea at the end of October 1914.

On 17 May 1915, the 15th and 18th half-flotillas left Kiel as the escort for the laying of a minefield off the Doggerbank by the light cruisers Stralsund and Strassburg, with a large force from the High Seas Fleet operating in distant support. Early on 18 May, the torpedo boat V157 rammed V150, sinking V150, while later that day, the light cruiser Danzig stuck a mine and was taken under tow by the cruiser Berlin. V180 and S178 spotted large numbers of floating mines in the vicinity of Danzig's mining. The 8th Torpedo Boat flotilla, including V180, was deployed to the Baltic together with the pre-dreadnought battleships of the IV Battle Squadron as temporary reinforcements in July 1915. On 10–11 July, V180 was part of the escort for a large sortie by battleships and armoured cruisers to the north of Gotland. On 13–14 July, V180 and V183 escorted the cruiser Bremen on a sortie into the Irben Strait. Bremen sighted torpedo tracks twice on the 14th, with the cruiser being narrowly missed on the second occasion. On 16 July, V180, together with G175 and S177 was sent to search for a ditched aircraft, with the torpedo boats advancing towards Lyserort, Latvia before S177 picked up the missing aircraft. In August 1915 the German Baltic Fleet, supported by a large portion of the High Seas Fleet, launched a major operation (later called the Battle of the Gulf of Riga) in the Gulf of Riga in support of the advance of German troops. It was planned to enter the Gulf via the Irben Strait, defeating any Russian naval forces and mining the entrance to Moon Sound. The 8th Flotilla, now listed as part of the Baltic Fleet, took part in this operation.

On 26 May 1916, the large torpedo boat V100 was torpedoed by the British submarine E18 40 nmi (46 mi; 74 km) northwest of Steinort (now Gleźnowo, Poland). The torpedo badly damaged V100, blowing off the torpedo boat's bow, killing 40 men and causing heavy flooding. S176 took V100 under stern-first tow, while V180 and S178 supported the stricken torpedo boat until they reached port.

In October 1917, the Germans carried out Operation Albion, an amphibious assault to capture Ösel and Muhu islands off the coast of Estonia. V180 was leader of the 8th Torpedo Boat flotilla during these operations. On 15 October, V180 led the battleships König and Kronprinz to the start position for that day's attack in the Irben Strait and then acted as a marker boat during the day's operations. On 18 October, V180 and V184 accompanied the minesweepers of the 3rd minesweeping half-flotilla as they progressed northwards up the southern part of Moon Sound (now Väinameri) towards Kuivastu. They spotted the Russian destroyers Zaibaikalets and Sil'nyi, which were laying mines. The two German torpedo boats opened fire, and set off in pursuit of the two Russian destroyers, which were withdrawing northwards. They then encountered two more Russian destroyers, General Kondratenko and Pogranichnik and the gunboat Chivinetz, which had been escorting ships evacuating troops from Muhu. The Russian warships advanced southwards, and engaged V180 and V184 with heavy fire, causing the two German torpedo boats to withdraw southwards under the cover of a smokescreen. The encounter caused the evacuation of Russian troops from Muhu to be stopped.

On 22 February 1918, V180 was renamed T180 in order to free up her name for new construction, in this case the 1918 Mobilisation type S180, which was laid down but never completed. In April 1918, T180 was still the leader of the 8th Torpedo Boat flotilla, which had returned to the High Seas Fleet. At the end of the war T180 remained a member of the 8th Flotilla.

=== Disposal ===
After the end of the war, T180 initially remained under the control of the Weimar Republic, but after the scuttling of the German fleet at Scapa Flow on 21 June 1919, was surrendered under the terms of Treaty of Versailles to compensate for the scuttled ships. T180 was sold for scrap in early 1921 at Rosyth and broken up at Dordrecht in the Netherlands later that year.

== Bibliography ==
- Chesneau, Roger; Kolesnik, Eugene M., eds. (1979). Conway's All The World's Fighting Ships 1860–1905. London: Conway Maritime Press. ISBN 0-85177-133-5.
- Dodson, Aidan (2019). "Beyond the Kaiser: The IGN's Destroyers and Torpedo Boats After 1918". In Jordan, John (ed.). Warship 2019. Oxford, UK: Osprey Publishing. pp. 129–144. ISBN 978-1-4728-3595-6.
- Firle, Rudolph (1921). Der Krieg in der Ostsee: Erster Band: Von Kriegsbeginn bis Mitte März 1915. Der Krieg zur See: 1914–1918 (in German). Berlin: Verlag von E. S. Mittler und Sohn.
- Fock, Harald (1981). Schwarze Gesellen: Band 2: Zerstörer bis 1914 (in German). Herford, Germany: Koelers Verlagsgesellschaft mBH. ISBN 3-7822-0206-6.
- Fock, Harald (1989). Z-Vor! Internationale Entwicklung und Kriegseinsätze von Zerstörern und Torpedobooten 1914 bis 1939 (in German). Herford, Germany: Koehlers Verlagsgesellschaft mBH. ISBN 3-7822-0207-4.
- Friedman, Norman (2011). Naval Weapons of World War One: Guns, Torpedoes, Mines and ASW Weapons of All Nations: An Illustrated Directory. Barnsley, UK: Seaforth Publishing. ISBN 978-1-84832-100-7.
- von Gagern, Ernst (1962). Der Krieg in der Ostsee: Dritter Band: Von Anfang 1916 bis zum Kriegsende (in German). Frankfurt: Verlag von E.S. Mittler & Sohn.
- Gardiner, Robert; Gray, Randal, eds. (1985). Conway's All The World's Fighting Ships 1906–1921. London: Conway Maritime Press. ISBN 0-85177-245-5.
- Gladisch, Walter, ed. (1965). Der Krieg in der Nordsee: Band 7: Vom Sommer 1917 bis zum Kriegsende 1918. Der Krieg zur See: 1914–1918 (in German). Frankfurt: Verlag E.S. Mittler & Sohn.
- Gröner, Erich; Jung, Dieter; Maass, Martin (1983). Die deutschen Kriegsschiffe 1815–1945: Band 2: Torpedoboote, Zerstörer, Schnellboote, Minensuchboote, Minenräumboote (in German). Koblenz: Bernard & Graef Verlag. ISBN 3-7637-4801-6.
- Gröner, Erich; Jung, Dieter; Maass, Martin (1990). German Warships 1915–1945: Volume One: Major Surface Vessels. Annapolis, Maryland, US: Naval Institute Press. ISBN 0-87021-790-9.
- Groos, O. (1924). Der Krieg in der Nordsee: Vierter Band: Von Anfang Februar bis Ende Dezember 1915. Der Krieg zur See: 1914–1918 (in German). Berlin: Verlag von E. S. Mittler und Sohn – via National Library of Estonia.
- Halpern, Paul G. (1994). A Naval History of World War I. London: UCL Press. ISBN 1-85728-498-4.
- Moore, John (1990). Jane's Fighting Ships of World War I. London: Studio. ISBN 1-85170-378-0.
- Rollmann, Heinrich (1929). Der Krieg in der Ostsee: Zweiter Band: Das Kreigjahr 1915. Der Krieg zur See: 1914–1918 (in German). Berlin: Verlag von E. S. Mittler und Sohn.
- Staff, Gary (2008). Battle for the Baltic Islands 1917: Triumph of the Imperial German Navy. Barnsley, UK: Pen & Sword Maritime. ISBN 9781783033188.
- Stoelzel, Albert (1930). Ehrenrangliste der Kaiserlich Deutschen Marine 1914–1918 (in German). Berlin: Thormann & Goetsch.
