= Operation Albion =

WWI German capture of western Estonia

Coordinates: 58°30′N 23°0′E

- Part of World War I
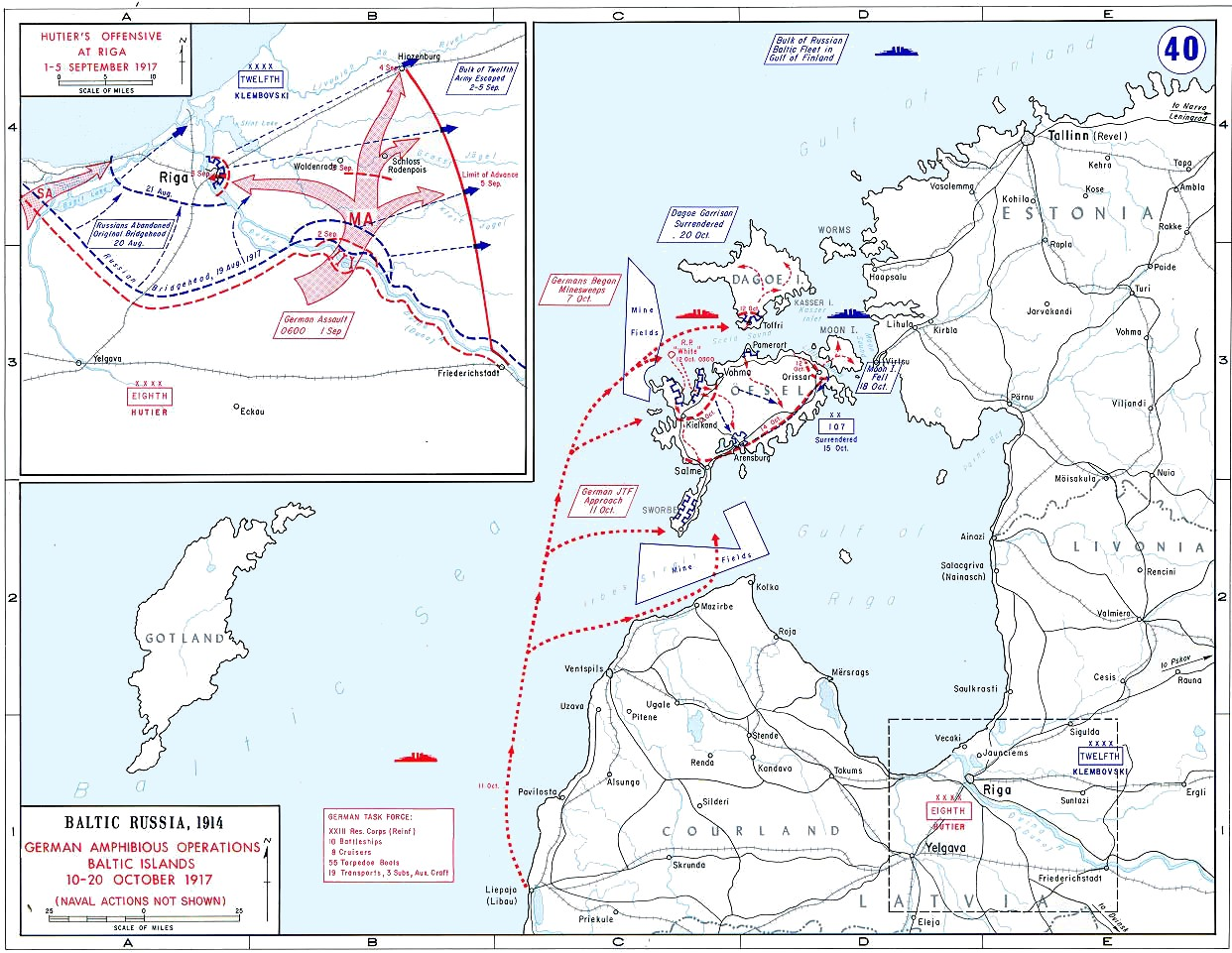
- Operation Albion amphibious operations 12–20 October 1917
Date	12–20 October 1917
Location	West Estonian archipelago, Baltic Sea
Result	German victory

Belligerents
Germany	Russia (United Kingdom of Great Britain and Ireland) United Kingdom

Commanders and leaders
(German Empire) Oskar von Hutier (German Empire) Hugo von Kathen (German Empire) Ludwig von Estorff (German Empire) Ehrhard Schmidt	(Russian Republic) Mikhail Bakhirev (Russian Republic) Vasily Altvater

Strength
1 battlecruiser 10 dreadnought battleships 9 light cruisers 1 mine cruiser 50 torpedo boats 6 U-boats; 19 transports 6 airships 102 combat aircraft 24,500 soldiers 8,500 horses 2,400 vehicles 150 machine guns 54 guns 12 mortars	2 pre-dreadnought battleships 2 cruisers 1 protected cruiser 21 destroyers 3 gunboats 3 submarines 24,000 soldiers

Casualties and losses
1 torpedo boat sunk (S 64); 7 minesweepers destroyed 9 trawlers & auxiliary vessels destroyed 5 aircraft shot down 156 killed 60 wounded (Navy); 54 killed 141 wounded (Army)	1 battleship sunk (Slava); 1 destroyer sunk (Grom); 1 submarine destroyed (HMS C32) 20,130 captured 141 guns lost (47 heavy guns); 130 machine guns lost 40 aircraft lost

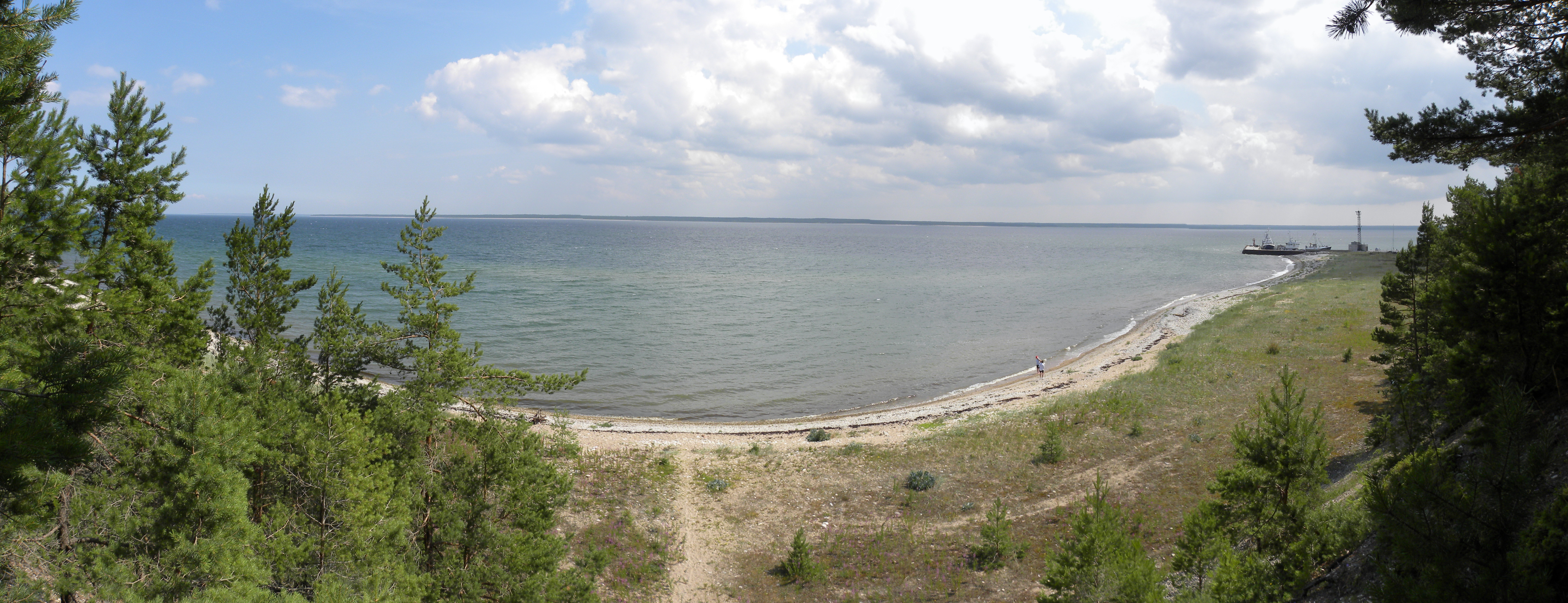
Panorama of the Tagalaht Bay, Saaremaa, Estonia, site of the German landing on 12 October 1917.

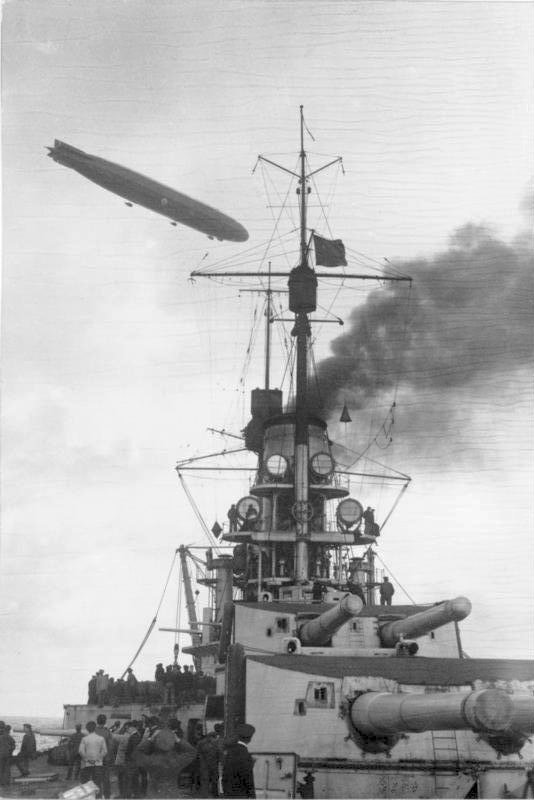
German battleship Grosser Kurfürst photographed during Operation Albion in October 1917. Above is the Schütte-Lanz naval airship S.L.20 (Type 'f').

Operation Albion was a German air, land and naval operation in the First World War, against Russian forces in October 1917 to occupy the West Estonian Archipelago. The campaign aimed to occupy the Baltic islands of Saaremaa (Ösel), Hiiumaa (Dagö) and Muhu (Moon). The three islands were part of the Russian Empire and strategically dominated the central and northern Baltic Sea. The land campaign opened with German landings at the Tagalaht (Tagga) bay on the island of Saaremaa (Ösel), on 12 October, after extensive naval operations to clear mines and subdue coastal artillery batteries. German forces secured the island by 16 October and the Russian army evacuated Muhu (Moon) on 20 October.

After two failed attempts, the German army landed on Hiiumaa (Dagö) on 12 October, capturing the island the following day. The Russian Baltic Fleet had to withdraw from the Suur Strait after its losses at the Battle of Moon Sound. The Germans claimed 20,000 prisoners and 100 guns captured during Operation Albion from 12 to 20 October 1917.

== Strategic significance ==
At the beginning of the First World War, the islands were of little importance to the Russian Empire or Germany. After the revolutionary turmoil in Russia during the early part of 1917, the German high command believed capturing the islands would outflank Russian defences and lay Petrograd (St. Petersburg) vulnerable to attack.

== Order of battle ==
=== German units ===
- Naval Forces(Sonderverband): Vice Admiral Ehrhard Schmidt
  - Battlecruiser: Moltke (flagship)
  - III Battle Squadron (III. Geschwader) (Vice Admiral Paul Behncke) dreadnought battleships: König (flagship), Bayern, Grosser Kurfürst, Kronprinz, Markgraf
  - IV Battle Squadron (IV. Geschwader) (Vice Admiral Wilhelm Souchon) dreadnought battleships: Friedrich der Grosse (flagship), König Albert, Kaiserin, Prinzregent Luitpold, Kaiser
  - II Scouting Group (II. Aufklärungsgruppe) (Rear Admiral Ludwig von Reuter) light cruisers: Königsberg (flagship), Karlsruhe, Nürnberg, Frankfurt, Danzig
  - IV Scouting Group (VI. Aufklärungsgruppe) (Rear Admiral Albert Hopman) light cruisers: Kolberg (flagship), Strassburg, Augsburg; minelayer: Nautilus; tender: Blitz
  - Torpedo Boats (Commodore Paul Heinrich) cruiser: Emden (flagship)
    - II Torpedo Boat Flotilla: B 98; 3rd Half-Flotilla: G 101, V 100, G 103, G 104; 4th Half-Flotilla: B 109, B 110, B 111, B 97, B 112
    - VI Torpedo Boat Flotilla: V 69; 12th Half-Flotilla: V 43, S 50, V 44, V 45, V 46; 13th Half-Flotilla: V 82, S 64, S 61, S 63, V 74
    - VIII Torpedo Boat Flotilla: V 180; 15th Half-Flotilla: V 183, V 185, V 181, V 184, V 182; 16th Half-Flotilla: S 176, S 178, G 174, S 179, V 186
    - X Torpedo Boat Flotilla:: S 56; 19th Half-Flotilla: T 170, T 169, T 172, G 175, T 165; 20th Half-Flotilla: V 78, V 77, G 89, S 65, S 66
    - VII Half-Flotilla: T 154, T 158, T 157, T 151, T 160, T 145, T 140, T 139
  - Courland Submarine Flotilla (U-BootsFlottille Kurland): UC 56, UC 57, UC 58, UC 59, UC 60, UC 78
  - Minesweepers (Minensuchdienst)
    - II Minesweeper Flotilla: A 62; 3rd Half-Flotilla: T 136, M 67, M 68, M 75, M 76, M 77, T 59, T 65, T 68, T 82, T 85; 4th Half-Flotilla: T 104, T 53, T 54, T 55, T 56, T 60, T 61, T 62, T 66, T 67, T 69; 8th Half-Flotilla: M 64, M 11, M 31, M 32, M 39, A 35
    - III Half-Flotilla of the Search Flotilla: T 141, 15 motor-boats
    - Mine-Searcher Group of the Outpost Half-Flotilla East: 6 fishing vessels
    - I Minesweeper Division (Riga): 11 motor-boats
    - II Minesweeper Division: 12 motor-boats
    - III Minesweeper Division: 12 motor-boats
    - IV Minesweeper Division: 10 motor-boats; outpost boat O 2
    - Mine-barrage Breaker group (Sperrbrechergruppe): Rio Parbo, Lothar, Schwaben, Elass
  - Anti-Submarine Forces (U-Bootsabwehr)
    - Baltic Search Flotilla: T 144; 1st half-flotilla: T 142, A 32, A 28, A 30, 32 fishing vessels; 2nd half-flotilla: T 130, A 31, A 27, A 29, 24 fishing vessels
- Ground Forces: Generalleutnant Ludwig von Estorff
  - 42nd Division
  - 2nd Infanterie Cyclist Brigade

=== Russian units ===
- 425th, 426th and 472nd Infantry Regiments
- Battleships: Grazhdanin, Slava
- Armored cruisers: Admiral Makarov, Bayan
- Destroyers: Desna, Novik, Pobeditel, Zabiyaka, Grom, Konstantin
- Gunboats: Khivinets, Grozyashchy
- Blockship: Lavwija
- Minelayer: Pripyat

=== British units ===
- Submarines: HMS C26, HMS C27, HMS C32

== See also ==
- German occupation of Estonia during World War I
- British submarine flotilla in the Baltic

== Citations and references ==
=== Cited sources ===
- Barrett, M. B. (2008). Operation Albion: The German Conquest of the Baltic Islands. Bloomington, IN: Indiana University Press. ISBN 978-0-253-34969-9.
- Buttar, Prit (2017). Russia's Last Gasp: The Eastern Front 1916–17. Oxford: Osprey Publishing. ISBN 978-1-47-282489-9.
- Gagern, Ernst Freiherr von (1964). Der Krieg zur See 1914–1918: Der Krieg in der Ostsee Bd.3 [The War at Sea 1914−1918: The War in the Eastern Sea] (in German). Vol. III. Frankfurt: Mittler & Sohn. OCLC 1240432483.
