= SMS S139 =

SMS S139 refers to two torpedo boats built for the German Kaiserliche Marine (Imperial Navy):

- SMS S139 (1906), a S138-class torpedo boat launched on 12 November 1906, renamed T139 in 1917 and renamed again as Pfeil in 1927. Still in service in 1944, but fate after then unrecorded.
- SMS S139 (1917), a 1916 Mobilisation Type torpedo boat launched on 24 November 1917. To France as Deligny in 1920 and scrapped in 1934.
