= SMS V181 =

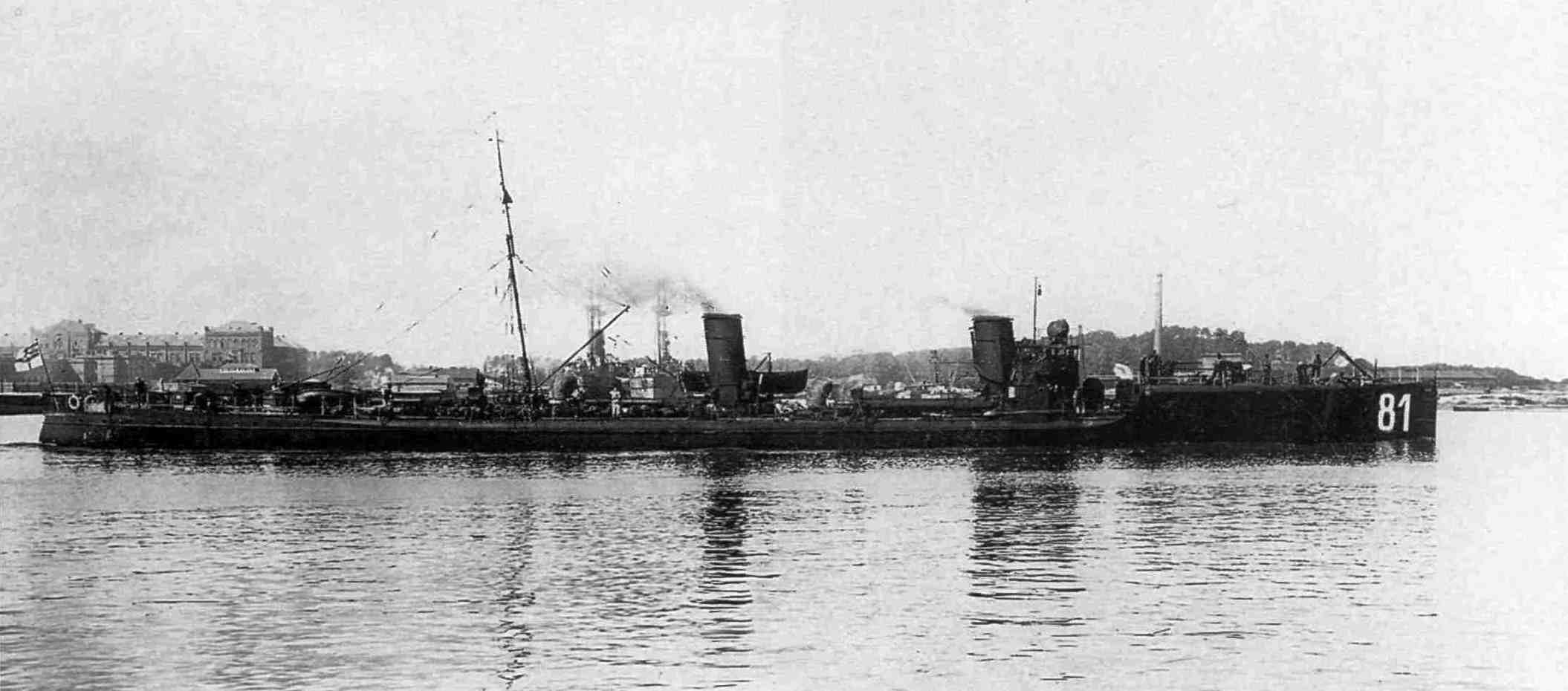

History

Germany
- Name: V181 until 22 February 1918; T181 from 22 February 1918
- Builder: AG Vulcan, Stettin
- Launched: 9 November 1909
- Completed: 11 March 1910
- Fate: Sold for scrap 1921

General characteristics
- Class & type: S138-class torpedo boat
- Displacement: 650 t (640 long tons) design
- Length: 73.9 m (242 ft 5 in) o/a
- Beam: 7.9 m (25 ft 11 in)
- Draught: 3.07 m (10 ft 1 in)
- Installed power: 18,000 PS (18,000 shp; 13,000 kW)
- Propulsion: 3 × boilers; 2 × steam turbines
- Speed: 32 kn (37 mph; 59 km/h)
- Complement: 84
- Armament: 2× 8.8 cm guns; 4× 50 cm torpedo tubes

SMS V181 (Note: "SMS" stands for "Seiner Majestät Schiff" (transl. His Majesty's Ship)) (Note: The "V" in V181 denoted the shipbuilder who constructed her, in this case AG Vulcan.) was a S-138-class large torpedo boat of the Imperial German Navy. She was built by the AG Vulcan shipyard at Stettin in 1909–1910, launching on 6 November 1909 and completing on 11 March 1910.

V180 took part in the First World War, serving in the North Sea and the Baltic Sea, taking part in actions including the Battle of Dogger Bank and Battle of the Gulf of Riga in 1915 and Operation Albion, the German invasion and occupation of the West Estonian Archipelago in 1917. She was renamed T181 in February 1918. Following the end of the First World War, T181 was surrendered as a reparation under the terms of the Treaty of Versailles, and was sold for scrap in 1922.

== Construction and design ==
The Imperial German Navy ordered 12 large torpedo boats (Große Torpedoboote) as part of the fiscal year 1909 shipbuilding programme, with two ships (G174 and G175) ordered from Germaniawerft, four (S176–S179) from Schichau-Werke and the remaining six ships (V180–V185) from AG Vulcan. The orders were split between the three shipyards in order to manage the workload and ensure continuous employment at all three companies.

V181 was 73.9 metres (242 ft 5 in) long overall and 73.6 metres (241 ft 6 in) between perpendiculars, with a beam of 7.9 metres (25 ft 11 in) and a draught of 3.07 metres (10 ft 1 in). The ship displaced 650 tonnes (640 long tons) design and 783 tonnes (771 long tons) deep load. Three coal-fired and one oil-fired water-tube boiler fed steam at a pressure of 18.5 standard atmospheres (272 psi) to two sets of AEG-Vulkan direct-drive steam turbines. The ship's machinery was rated at 18,000 PS (18,000 shp; 13,000 kW) giving a design speed of 32 knots (37 mph; 59 km/h), with members of the class reaching a speed of 33.3 knots (38.3 mph; 61.7 km/h) during sea trials.

The ship was armed with two 8.8 cm SK L/45 naval guns, (Note: SK stood for Schnellfeuerkanone (quick-firing gun) or Schnellade-Kanone (fast-loading gun).) (Note: In Imperial German Navy gun nomenclature, the L/35 denotes the length of the gun. In this case, the L/35 gun is 35 caliber, meaning that the gun has an overall length 35 times greater than the gun's bore.) (Note: Conway's All The World's Fighting Ships and Jane's Fighting Ships claim L/30 guns were fitted, while Fock claims the ships were refitted with L/45 guns.) one on the forecastle and one aft. Four single 50 cm (19.7 in) torpedo tubes were fitted, with two on the ship's beam in the gap behind the ship's bridge and fore funnel, and two aft of the second funnel. The ship had a crew of 84 officers and men.

V181 was laid down at AG Vulcan's Stettin shipyard as Yard number 296 and was launched on 6 November 1909 and commissioned on 11 March 1910.

== Service ==
In 1911, V181 was part of the 12th half-flotilla of the 6th Torpedo Boat Flotilla. The ship remained a member of the 12th half-flotilla in 1912, and in 1913, although the half-flotilla was now in reserve.

=== First World War ===
While the German Navy mobilised on 1 August 1914, owing to the imminent outbreak of the First World War, V181 was not immediately brought forward to active service, but by the middle of October, V181 was a member of the 15th half-flotilla of the 8th Torpedo Boat Flotilla, part of the High Seas Fleet. On 20 November 1914, V181 was patrolling to the northwest of Helgoland, when she was attacked by the British submarine E11, which fired two torpedoes at V181, both of which missed the target. On 24 November 1914, British cruisers and destroyers, supported by the Grand Fleet, staged a reconnaissance into the Helgoland Bight with the intention of provoking a German reaction, closing to 15 nmi (17 mi; 28 km) of Helgoland. V181 spotted several of the British ships, and the 8th Torpedo Boat Flotilla shadowed the British forces, but no engagement resulted.

On 23 January 1915, a German force of battlecruisers and light cruisers, escorted by torpedo boats, and commanded by Admiral Franz von Hipper, made a sortie to attack British fishing boats on the Dogger Bank, with V181 forming part of the escort for Hipper's force. British battlecruisers supported by the Harwich Force of light cruisers and destroyers intercepted the German force on the morning of 24 January in the Battle of Dogger Bank, in which the German armoured cruiser Blücher was sunk and German battlecruiser Seydlitz and the British battlecruiser Lion badly damaged.

In May 1915, V181 was sent to the Baltic Sea as part of a major deployment of ships from the High Seas Fleet to reinforce the German naval forces in the Baltic, which were deployed to support the German Army's advance on Libau (now Liepāja), Latvia. Early on 7 May, V181 was accompanying the cruiser München when they encountered the Russian armoured cruisers Admiral Makarov, Bayan, Oleg, and Bogatyr. A brief, inconclusive, clash between München and the four Russian cruisers occurred. V181 prepared to carry out a torpedo attack against the Russian ships, but the commander of the 15th half-flotilla, who was aboard V181, thought that the attack would not be successful owing to the poor light and the long range to the Russian ships, and ordered the attack to be cancelled. The forces from the High Seas Fleet returned to the North Sea shortly after the German capture of Libau. The 8th Torpedo Boat flotilla, including V181 was again deployed to the Baltic in July 1915. V181 took part in a sortie to the north of Gotland on 10–11 July. On 17 July, V181, together with sister ship V183 and the large torpedo boat V99 were simulating laying a minefield north of Windau (now Ventspils) when they encountered four Russian destroyers. The Russian ships opened fire at a range of 8,000–9,000 m (8,700–9,800 yd) while the German ships could not respond as their guns had a maximum range of only 7,100 m (7,800 yd). The Russian ships soon broke off the engagement due to fear of submarine attack. In August 1915 the German Baltic Fleet, supported by a large portion of the High Seas Fleet, launched a major operation (later called the Battle of the Gulf of Riga) in the Gulf of Riga in support of the advance of German troops. It was planned to enter the Gulf via the Irben Strait, defeating any Russian naval forces and mining the entrance to Moon Sound. The 8th Flotilla, now listed as part of the Baltic Fleet, took part in this operation.

V181 remained part of the 15th half flotilla of the 8th Torpedo Boat Flotilla, which was still part of the Baltic Fleet, in May 1916. In October 1917, the Germans carried out Operation Albion, an amphibious assault to capture Ösel and Muhu islands off the coast of Estonia. V183 took part in Operation Albion as part of the 15th half flotilla.

On 22 February 1918, V181 was renamed T181 in order to free up her name for new construction. By the end of April 1918, T181 was listed as a member of the 10th half-flotilla of the 5th Torpedo Boat Flotilla, part of the High Seas Fleet. The need to escort German U-boats through minefields in the German Bight resulted in the formation of large escort flotillas early in 1918, and by the end of the war, T181 had joined the 2nd half-flotilla of the 1st Escort Flotilla.

=== Disposal ===
The Armistice of 11 November 1918 resulted in most of the High Seas Fleet being interned at Scapa Flow. T181 was initially retained by Germany, but following the Scuttling of the German fleet at Scapa Flow on 21 June 1919, the terms of Treaty of Versailles required more ships to be surrendered to compensate for the scuttled ships. These additional ships included T181, which was stricken on 20 August 1920, and allocated to Japan. The ship was scrapped at Dordrecht in the Netherlands in 1922.

== Bibliography ==
- Chesneau, Roger; Kolesnik, Eugene M., eds. (1979). Conway's All The World's Fighting Ships 1860–1905. London: Conway Maritime Press. ISBN 0-85177-133-5.
- Dodson, Aidan (2019). "Beyond the Kaiser: The IGN's Destroyers and Torpedo Boats After 1918". In Jordan, John (ed.). Warship 2019. Oxford, UK: Osprey Publishing. pp. 129–144. ISBN 978-1-4728-3595-6.
- Fock, Harald (1981). Schwarze Gesellen: Band 2: Zerstörer bis 1914 (in German). Herford, Germany: Koelers Verlagsgesellschaft mBH. ISBN 3-7822-0206-6.
- Fock, Harald (1989). Z-Vor! Internationale Entwicklung und Kriegseinsätze von Zerstörern und Torpedobooten 1914 bis 1939 (in German). Herford, Germany: Koehlers Verlagsgesellschaft mBH. ISBN 3-7822-0207-4.
- Friedman, Norman (2011). Naval Weapons of World War One: Guns, Torpedoes, Mines and ASW Weapons of All Nations: An Illustrated Directory. Barnsley, UK: Seaforth Publishing. ISBN 978-1-84832-100-7.
- Gardiner, Robert; Gray, Randal, eds. (1985). Conway's All The World's Fighting Ships 1906–1921. London: Conway Maritime Press. ISBN 0-85177-245-5.
- von Gagern, Ernst (1962). Der Krieg in der Ostsee: Dritter Band: Von Anfang 1916 bis zum Kriegsende. Der Krieg zur See: 1914–1918 (in German). Frankfurt: Verlag von E.S. Mittler & Sohn.
- Gladisch, Walter, ed. (1965). Der Krieg in der Nordsee: Band 7: Vom Sommer 1917 bis zum Kriegsende 1918. Der Krieg zur See: 1914–1918. Frankfurt: Verlag E.S. Mittler & Sohn.
- Gröner, Erich; Jung, Dieter; Maass, Martin (1983). Die deutschen Kriegsschiffe 1815–1945: Band 2: Torpedoboote, Zerstörer, Schnellboote, Minensuchboote, Minenräumboote (in German). Koblenz: Bernard & Graef Verlag. ISBN 3-7637-4801-6.
- Gröner, Erich; Jung, Dieter; Maass, Martin (1990). German Warships 1915–1945: Volume One: Major Surface Vessels. Annapolis, Maryland, US: Naval Institute Press. ISBN 0-87021-790-9.
- Groos, O. (1923). Der Krieg in der Nordsee: Dritter Band: Von Ende November 1914 bis Unfang Februar 1915. Der Krieg zur See: 1914–1918. Berlin: Verlag von E. S. Mittler und Sohn – via National Library of Estonia.
- Halpern, Paul G. (1994). A Naval History of World War I. London: UCL Press. ISBN 1-85728-498-4.
- Massie, Robert K. (2007). Castles of Steel: Britain, Germany and the Winning of the Great War at Sea. London: Vintage Books. ISBN 978-0-099-52378-9.
- Moore, John (1990). Jane's Fighting Ships of World War I. London: Studio. ISBN 1-85170-378-0.
- Monograph No. 28: Home Waters Part III: From November 1914 to the end of January 1915 (PDF). Naval Staff Monographs (Historical). Vol. XII. Naval Staff, Training and Staff Duties Division. 1925. Archived from the original (PDF) on 3 December 2023.
- Rollmann, Heinrich (1929). Der Krieg in der Ostsee: Zweiter Band: Das Kreigjahr 1915. Der Krieg zur See: 1914–1918 (in German). Berlin: Verlag von E. S. Mittler und Sohn.
- Stoelzel, Albert (1930). Ehrenrangliste der Kaiserlich Deutschen Marine 1914–1918 (in German). Berlin: Thormann & Goetsch.
