= SMS S31 (1913) =

Torpedo boat

History

German Empire
- Name: S31
- Ordered: 1913
- Builder: Schichau-Werke, Elbing
- Launched: 20 December 1913
- Commissioned: 9 August 1914
- Fate: Sunk by mine 19 August 1915

General characteristics
- Displacement: 971 tonnes (956 long tons)
- Length: 79.6 m (261 ft 2 in)
- Beam: 8.3 m (27 ft 3 in)
- Draft: 2.8 m (9 ft 2 in)
- Installed power: 23,500 shp (17,500 kW)
- Propulsion: 3 × water-tube boilers; 2× Steam turbines; 2 shafts
- Speed: 33.5 knots (62.0 km/h; 38.6 mph)
- Range: 1,100 nmi (2,000 km; 1,300 mi) at 20 knots (37 km/h; 23 mph)
- Complement: 83 officers and sailors
- Armament: 3 × 8.8 cm (3.5 in) SK L/45 guns; 6 × 500 mm torpedo tubes; 24 mines

SMS S31 (Note: "SMS" stands for "Seiner Majestät Schiff" ('His Majesty's Ship')) (Note: The "S" in S31 denoted the shipbuilder who constructed her.) was a 1913 Type Large Torpedo Boat (Großes Torpedoboot ) of the Imperial German Navy. Commissioned in August 1914, it served during World War I and was sunk by a mine during the Battle of the Gulf of Riga on 19 August 1915.

== Construction ==
In 1913, the Imperial German Navy placed orders for 12 high-seas torpedo boats, with a half-flotilla of six ordered from AG Vulcan (V25–V30) and Schichau-Werke (S31–S36). While the designs built by each shipyard were broadly similar, they differed from each other in detail, and were significantly larger and more capable than the small torpedo boats built for the German Navy in the last two years. S31 was the first of the six torpedo-boats ordered from the Schichau-Werke.

S31 was launched at Schichau's Elbing shipyard on 20 December 1913 and commissioned on 8 August 1914.

S31 was 79.6 metres (261 ft 2 in) long overall and 79.0 metres (259 ft 2 in) at the waterline, with a beam of 8.3 metres (27 ft 3 in) and a draft of 2.8 metres (9 ft 2 in). Displacement was 802 tonnes (789 long tons) normal and 971 tonnes (956 long tons) deep load. Three oil-fired water-tube boilers fed steam to 2 sets of Schichau steam turbines rated at 23,500 shaft horsepower (17,500 kW), giving a speed of 33.5 knots (62.0 km/h; 38.6 mph). 220 tonnes (220 long tons) of fuel oil was carried, giving a range of 1,100 nautical miles (2,000 km; 1,300 mi) at 20 knots (37 km/h; 23 mph).

Armament consisted of three 8.8 cm SK L/45 naval guns in single mounts, together with six 50 cm (19.7 in) torpedo tubes with two fixed single tubes forward and 2 twin mounts aft. Up to 24 mines could be carried. The ship had a complement of 83 officers and men.

== Service ==
In October 1914 S31 was a member of the 17th Half-Flotilla and took part in operations in the Baltic Sea. During August 1915 S31, as part of the 9th Torpedo Boat Flotilla, took part in the Battle of the Gulf of Riga. It struck a mine near the island of Ruhnu on 19 August, sinking with the loss of 11 men. The survivors were rescued by V184 and S35.
