= SMS V185 =

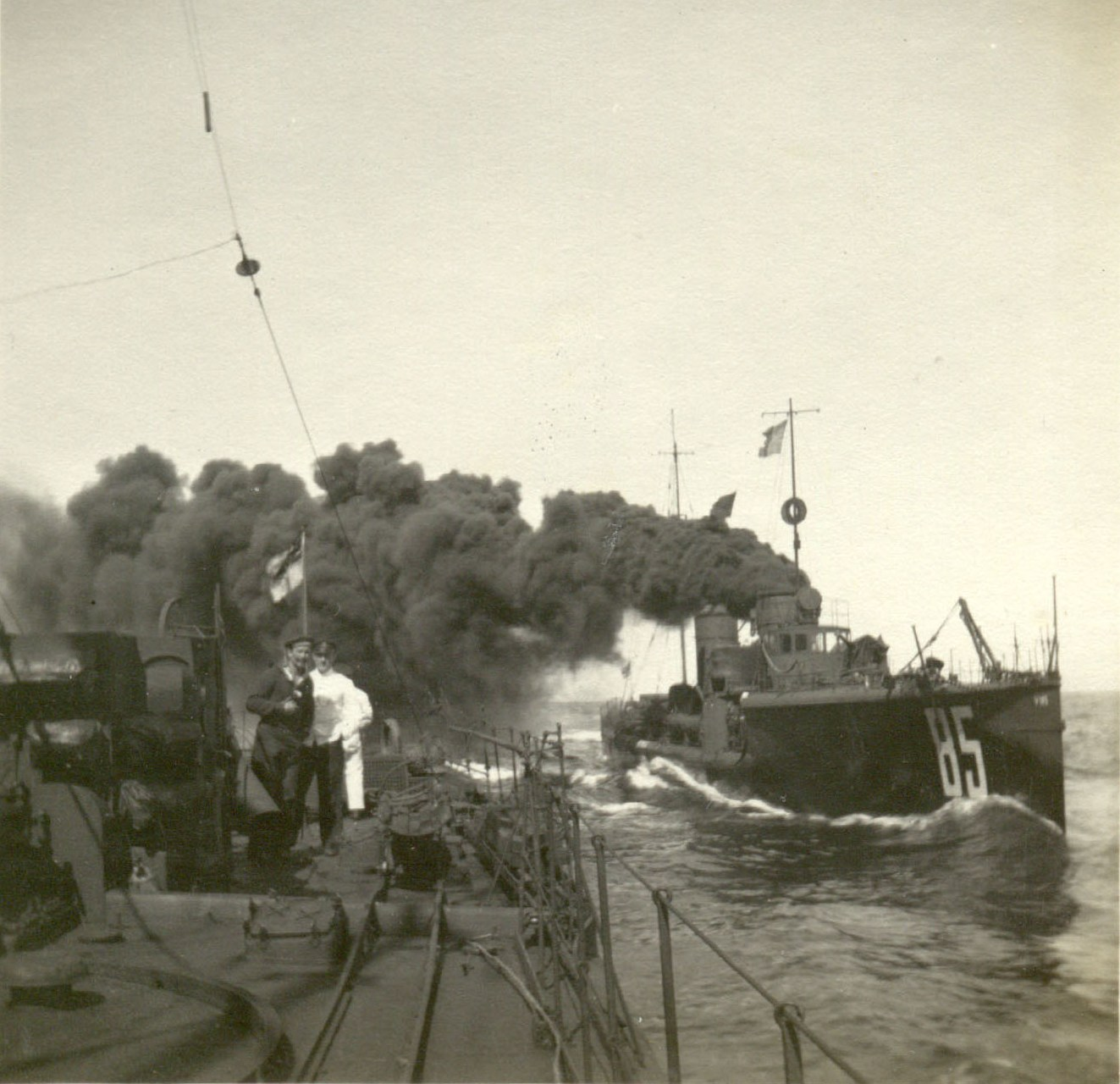

History

Germany
- Name: V185 until 22 February 1918; T185 from 22 February 1918 to 4 October 1932; Blitz from 4 October 1932 to 1945
- Builder: AG Vulcan, Stettin
- Launched: 9 April 1910
- Completed: 20 September 1910
- Fate: Ceded to Soviet Union 1946
- Notes: Converted to control ship for radio-controlled target ship, 1932

Soviet Union
- Name: Vystrel
- Acquired: 8 January 1946
- Fate: Unknown

General characteristics
- Class & type: S138-class torpedo boat
- Displacement: 650 t (640 long tons) design
- Length: 73.9 m (242 ft 5 in) o/a
- Beam: 7.9 m (25 ft 11 in)
- Draught: 3.07 m (10 ft 1 in)
- Installed power: 18,000 PS (18,000 shp; 13,000 kW)
- Propulsion: 3 × boilers; 2 × steam turbines
- Speed: 32 kn (37 mph; 59 km/h)
- Complement: 84
- Armament: 2× 8.8 cm guns; 4× 50 cm torpedo tubes

SMS V185 (Note: "SMS" stands for "Seiner Majestät Schiff" (transl. His Majesty's Ship)) (Note: The "V" in V185 denoted the shipbuilder who constructed her, in this case AG Vulcan.) was a S-138-class large torpedo boat of the Imperial German Navy. She was built by the AG Vulcan shipyard at Stettin in 1910, launching on 9 April that year.

V185 took part the First World War, serving in the North Sea and the Baltic, and was renamed T185 in February 1918. She continued in service following the end of the war, becoming a control boat for the target ship Hessen in 1932 when she was renamed Blitz. She was ceded to the Soviet Union in 1945 at the end of the Second World War and was renamed Vystrel.

== Construction and design ==
The Imperial German Navy ordered 12 large torpedo boats (Große Torpedoboote) as part of the fiscal year 1909 shipbuilding programme, with two ships (G174 and G175) ordered from Germaniawerft, four (S176–S179) from Schichau-Werke and the remaining six ships (V180–V185) from AG Vulcan.

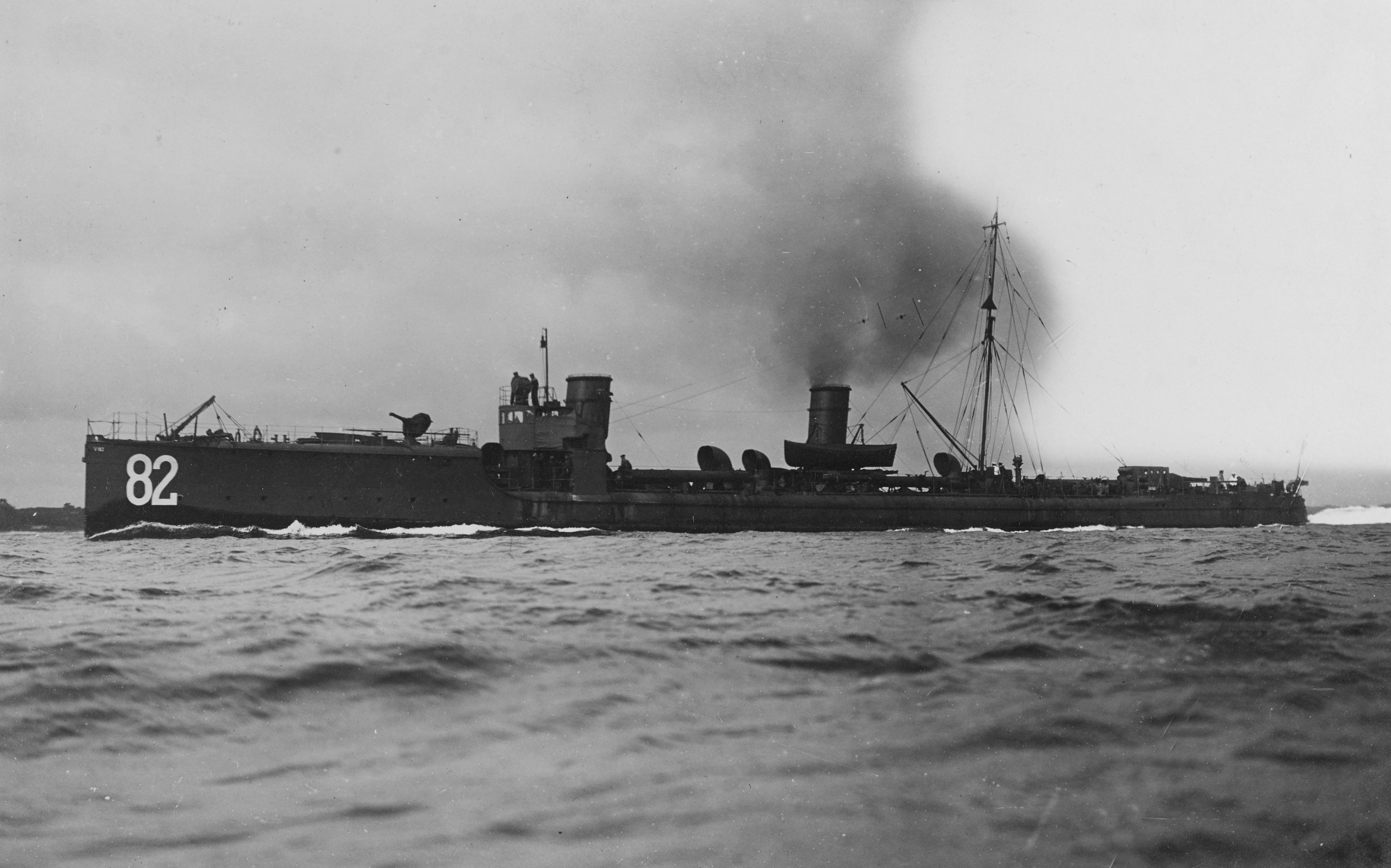
Sister ship V182

V185 was 73.9 metres (242 ft 5 in) long overall and 73.6 metres (241 ft 6 in) between perpendiculars, with a beam of 7.9 metres (25 ft 11 in) and a draught of 3.07 metres (10 ft 1 in). The ship displaced 650 tonnes (640 long tons) design and 783 tonnes (771 long tons) deep load. Three coal-fired and one oil-fired water-tube boiler fed steam at a pressure of 18.5 standard atmospheres (272 psi) to two sets of direct-drive steam turbines. The ship's machinery was rated at 18,000 PS (18,000 shp; 13,000 kW) giving a design speed of 32 knots (37 mph; 59 km/h), with members of the class reaching a speed of 33.3 knots (38.3 mph; 61.7 km/h) during sea trials. 121 tons of coal and 76 tons of oil fuel were carried, giving an endurance of 2,360 nautical miles (2,720 mi; 4,370 km) at 12 knots (14 mph; 22 km/h), 1,250 nautical miles (1,440 mi; 2,320 km) at 17 knots (20 mph; 31 km/h) or 480 nautical miles (550 mi; 890 km) at 30 knots (35 mph; 56 km/h).

The ship was armed with two 8.8 cm L/45 guns, (Note: Both Conway's All The World's Fighting Ships and Jane's Fighting Ships claim L/30 guns were fitted.) one on the forecastle and one aft. Four single 50 cm (19.7 in) torpedo tubes were fitted, with two on the ship's beam in the gap behind the ship's bridge and fore funnel, and two aft of the second funnel. The ship had a crew of 84 officers and men.

V185 was laid down at AG Vulcan's Stettin shipyard as Yard number 300 and was launched on 9 April 1910 and completed on 20 September 1910.

=== Modifications ===
The ship was modified with two 10.5 cm L/45 guns replacing the 8.8.cm guns in the 1920s, while her boilers were converted to oil firing in 1923–1934. By 1928 the ship's forecastle had been extended further rearward.

== Service ==
In 1911, V185 was the part of the 12th half-flotilla of the 6th Torpedo Boat Flotilla. The ship remained a member of the 12th half-flotilla in 1912, and in 1913, although the half-flotilla was now in reserve.

=== First World War ===
On 23 January 1915, a German force of battlecruisers and light cruisers, escorted by torpedo boats, and commanded by Admiral Franz von Hipper, made a sortie to attack British fishing boats on the Dogger Bank. V185, part of the 15th Half-flotilla, formed part of the escort for Hipper's force. British Naval Intelligence was warned of the raid by radio messages decoded by Room 40, and sent out the Battlecruiser Force from Rosyth, commanded by Admiral Beatty aboard Lion and the Harwich Force of light cruisers and destroyers, to intercept the German force. The British and German Forces met on the morning of 24 January in the Battle of Dogger Bank. On sighting the British, Hipper ordered his ships to head south-east to escape the British, who set off in pursuit. The armoured cruiser Blücher was disabled by British shells and was sunk, but the rest of the German force escaped, with the German battlecruiser Seydlitz and the British battlecruiser Lion badly damaged.

In May 1915, V185, as part of the 15th Half-flotilla of the 8th Torpedo Boat flotilla, was deployed to the Baltic Sea to reinforce the German naval forces in the Baltic, which were deployed to support the German Army's advance on Libau (now Liepāja), Latvia. The 8th Torpedo Boat flotilla, including V185 was again deployed to the Baltic in July 1915. V185 took part in a sortie to the north of Gotland on 10–11 July. In August 1915 the Germans detached a large portion of the High Seas Fleet for operations in the Gulf of Riga in support of the advance of German troops. It was planned to enter the Gulf via the Irben Strait, defeating any Russian naval forces and mining the entrance to Moon Sound. On 19 August, V185 took part in a clash with Russian ships during which the Russian gunboat Sivuch was sunk by the battleships Nassau and Posen, helping to rescue survivors from the sunken Russian ship.

In October 1917, the Germans carried out Operation Albion, an amphibious assault to capture Ösel and Muhu islands off the coast of Estonia. V185, still part of the 15th Half-flotilla of the 8th Torpedo Boat flotilla, took part in Operation Albion.

In 1918, V185 joined an escort flotilla, and was renamed T185 on 22 February 1918. She remained a member of the 1st Half-flotilla of the 1st Escort Flotilla at the end of the war. (Note: The 1st Escort Flotilla comprised three Half-flotillas, with a total of 36 torpedo boats operated.)

=== Between the wars ===
After the end of the First World War, the scuttling of the German High Seas Fleet at Scapa Flow on 21 June 1919 and the Treaty of Versailles left Germany with a small navy of obsolete warships. T185 was one of four destroyers which Germany was allowed to keep in reserve, (with guns mounted, but without stores or ammunition) alongside twelve active destroyers. (Note: Although treated as destroyers under the treaty, V185 and other similar ships were always referred to as torpedo boats by the Germans.) In 1932, T185 was converted to serve as a control vessel for the radio-target vessel (and former battleship) Zähringen and as a high speed tug, taking the name Blitz, which had been used for Zähringen's previous control ship (the former T141), on 4 October 1932. Blitz continued as a radio-control ship for Zähringen and later Hessen through to the end of the Second World War. The ship was handed over to the Soviet Union on 8 January 1946, being renamed Vystrel, but her fate in Soviet hands is unknown.

== Bibliography ==
- Dodson, Aidan (2019). "Beyond the Kaiser: The IGN's Destroyers and Torpedo Boats After 1918". In Jordan, John (ed.). Warship 2019. Oxford, UK: Osprey Publishing. pp. 129–144. ISBN 978-1-4728-3595-6.
- Fock, Harald (1989). Z-Vor! Internationale Entwicklung und Kriegseinsätze von Zerstörern und Torpedobooten 1914 bis 1939 (in German). Herford, Germany: Koehlers Verlagsgesellschaft mBH. ISBN 3-7822-0207-4.
- von Gagern, Ernst (1962). Der Krieg in der Ostsee: Dritter Band: Von Anfang 1916 bis zum Kriegsende (in German). Frankfurt: Verlag von E.S. Mittler & Sohn.
- Gardiner, Robert; Chesneau, Robert, eds. (1980). Conway's All The World's Fighting Ships 1922–1946. London: Conway Maritime Press. ISBN 0-85177-146-7.
- Gardiner, Robert; Gray, Randal, eds. (1985). Conway's All The World's Fighting Ships 1906–1921. London: Conway Maritime Press. ISBN 0-85177-245-5.
- Gröner, Erich; Jung, Dieter; Maass, Martin (1983). Die deutschen Kriegsschiffe 1815–1945: Band 2: Torpedoboote, Zerstörer, Schnellboote, Minensuchboote, Minenräumboote (in German). Koblenz: Bernard & Graef Verlag. ISBN 3-7637-4801-6.
- Groos, O. (1923). Der Krieg in der Nordsee: Dritter Band: Von Ende November 1914 bis Unfang Februar 1915. Der Krieg zur See: 1914–1918. Berlin: Verlag von E. S. Mittler und Sohn – via National Library of Estonia.
- Halpern, Paul G. (1994). A Naval History of World War I. London: UCL Press. ISBN 1-85728-498-4.
- Hildebrand, Hans H.; Röhr, Albert; Steinmetz, Hans-Otto (1983). Die Deutschen Kriegschiffe Biographien: ein Spiegel der Marinegeschichte von 1815 bis zur Gegenwart: Band 7 (in German). Herford, Germany: Koeleers Verlagsgesellschaft mBH. ISBN 3-7822-0267-8.
- Massie, Robert K. (2007). Castles of Steel: Britain, Germany and the Winning of the Great War at Sea. London: Vintage Books. ISBN 978-0-099-52378-9.
- Moore, John (1990). Jane's Fighting Ships of World War I. London: Studio. ISBN 1-85170-378-0.
- Rollmann, Heinrich (1929). Der Krieg in der Ostsee: Zweiter Band: Das Kreigjahr 1915. Der Krieg zur See: 1914–1918 (in German). Berlin: Verlag von E. S. Mittler und Sohn.
