= SMS S23 (1913) =

V1-class torpedo boat of the Imperial German Navy

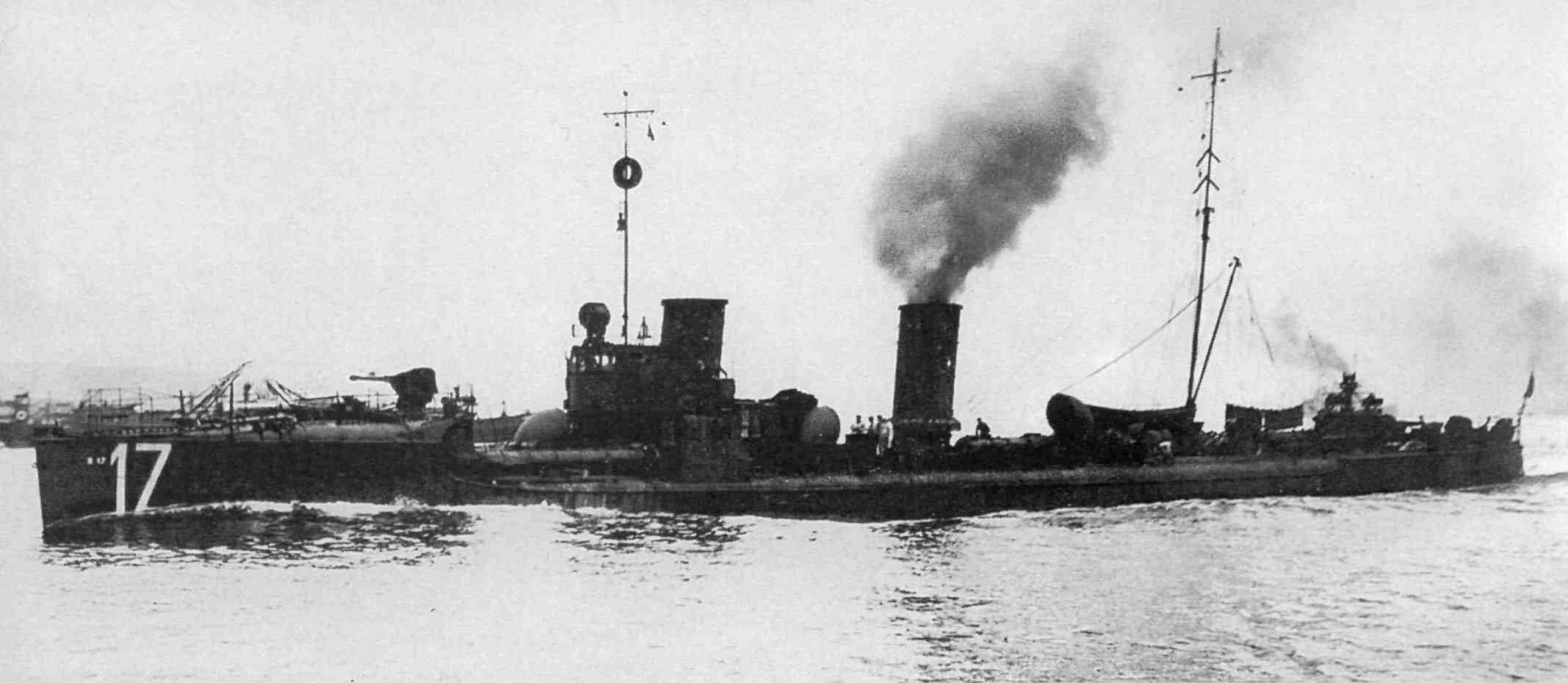
- Sister ship S17

History

Germany
- Name: S23 until 1923, T23 until 1939; T123 1939, Komet 1939–1945
- Builder: Schichau-Werke, Elbing
- Launched: 29 March 1913
- Commissioned: 1 November 1913
- Fate: To Soviet Union 1946

General characteristics
- Displacement: 568 t (559 long tons) normal
- Length: 71.5 m (234 ft 7 in) oa
- Beam: 7.43 m (24 ft 5 in)
- Draft: 2.77 m (9 ft 1 in)
- Propulsion: 4× water-tube boilers; 2× steam turbines; 15,700 metric horsepower (15,500 shp; 11,500 kW)
- Speed: 32.5 knots (60.2 km/h; 37.4 mph)
- Range: 1,050 nmi (1,940 km; 1,210 mi) at 17 knots (31 km/h; 20 mph)
- Complement: 74 officers and sailors
- Armament: 2 x 8.8 cm (3.5 in)/30 guns; 4 x 50 cm (20 in) torpedo tubes

SMS S23 (Note: "SMS" stands for "Seiner Majestät Schiff" (German: His Majesty's Ship)) (Note: The "S" in S23 denotes the shipyard at which she was built, in this case Schichau-Werke.) was a V1-class torpedo boat of the Imperial German Navy. The ship was built by Schichau-Werke, at their Elbing shipyard, completing in 1913.

S23 served as part of the German High Seas Fleet through the First World War, taking part in the Battle of Jutland in 1916. The ship continued in German service after the end of the war, as part of the Weimar Republic's Reichsmarine, and was renamed T23 in 1932, continuing as part of Nazi Germany's Kriegsmarine from 1935. The ship was renamed T123 in 1939, and later that year, was converted into a control ship for radio-controlled target ships, being renamed Komet. She was ceded to the Soviet Union in 1946 following the end of the Second World War.

== Construction and design ==
The V1-class was a new class of torpedo boat intended to be smaller and more manoeuvrable than the Imperial German Navy's latest torpedo boats, which would be more suitable for working with the fleet. Twelve ships were ordered from AG Vulcan and Germaniawerft (Note: The Imperial German Navy's practice was to split a year's orders into half-flotillas of six torpedo boats from different builders, to differing detailed design.) under the 1911 construction programme, while in 1912, twelve ships of similar design (S13–S24) were ordered from Schichau-Werke. The reduction in size resulted in the ships' seaworthiness being adversely affected, however, and range being reduced, with the 1911 and 1912 torpedo boats acquiring the disparaging nickname "Admiral Lans' cripples".

The Schichau boats were 71.5 m (234 ft 7 in) long overall and 71.0 m (232 ft 11 in) at the waterline, with a beam of 7.43 m (24 ft 5 in) and a draught of 2.77 m (9 ft 1 in). Displacement was 568 tonnes (559 long tons) normal and 695 tonnes (684 long tons) deep load. Three coal-fired and one oil-fired water-tube boilers fed steam to two direct-drive steam turbines rated at 15,700 metric horsepower (15,500 shp; 11,500 kW), giving a design speed of 32.5 knots (60.2 km/h; 37.4 mph). 108 tonnes (106 long tons) of coal and 72 tonnes (71 long tons) of oil were carried, giving a range of 1,050 nautical miles (1,940 km; 1,210 mi) at 17 knots (31 km/h; 20 mph) or 600 nautical miles (1,100 km; 690 mi) at 29 knots (54 km/h; 33 mph).

S23's armament consisted of two 8.8 cm (3.5 in) SK L/30 naval guns (Note: In Imperial German Navy gun nomenclature, the L/30 denotes the length of the gun. In this case, the L/30 gun is 30 caliber, meaning that the gun is 30 times as long as it is in diameter.) in single mounts fore and aft, together with four 50 cm (19.7 in) torpedo tubes with one reload torpedo carried. Up to 18 mines could be carried. In 1916, the guns were replaced by more powerful 8.8 cm SK L/45 naval guns, and in 1923 the ship was again rearmed, with two 10.5 cm L/45 guns replacing the 8.8 cm guns and the torpedo armament reducing to two 50 cm tubes with two reloads.

The ship had a crew of 3 officers and 71 other ranks.

S23, yard number 874, was launched at Schichau's shipyard in Elbing, East Prussia (now Elbląg in Poland) on 29 March 1913 and was commissioned on 1 November 1913.

== Service ==
In May 1914, S23 was a member of the 14th half-flotilla of the 7th Torpedo boat Flotilla. She remained part of the 14th half-flotilla at the outbreak of the First World War in August 1914. The 7th Torpedo Boat Flotilla supported the Raid on Yarmouth on 3 November 1914 and the Raid on Scarborough, Hartlepool and Whitby on 16 December 1914.

In May 1915, in support of the Gorlice–Tarnów offensive on the Eastern Front, Germany launched an attack against Libau (now Liepāja) in Latvia, with naval support from the German navy. The 14th half-flotilla, (Note: S23, S19, S20 and S22) including S23, formed part of a force of four light cruisers and 21 torpedo boats detached from the High Seas Fleet in support of the Baltic operations. They were used to prevent interference by the Russian navy with the operations, patrolling between Ösel and Gotska Sandön and between Gotska Sandön and the Swedish coast. S23 and sister ship S20 operated in support of the light cruisers of IV Scouting Group on 7 May, and on 8 May, S20 and S23 were attacked by the British submarine E9. S20 spotted the conning tower of E9 but dense fog caused contact to be lost before the torpedo boats could retaliate. The force detached from the High Seas Fleet was recalled to the North Sea soon after Libau was captured on 8 May. On the night of 19/20 December 1915, the two torpedo boats S23 and sister ship S22 stopped the Swedish steamer Argo, suspected of carrying contraband to Russia, near Simrishamn on the East coast of Sweden. Argo rammed S22 and made off, ignoring a warning shot over her bows, with the two torpedo boats not opening fire as their commanding officer was unsure whether they were in Swedish territorial waters. The Flotilla commander ordered the torpedo boats S15 and S17 to intercept Argo and to use "all means" to capture the ship. Argo was seized at Utlängan in Swedish waters, and taken to the German port of Swinemünde (now Świnoujście in Poland) but was released after a few hours.

S23, as part of the 7th flotilla, was part of the High Seas Fleet when it sailed to cover the Lowestoft Raid on 24–25 April 1916. At the Battle of Jutland on 31 May–1 June 1916, S23 was still part of the 14th Half-flotilla of the 7th Torpedo boat flotilla, operating in support of the main German battle fleet. During the "Run to the North", S23 was deployed to starboard of the battleships of I Battle Squadron. During the night action, the 7th flotilla was ordered to search for and attack the British fleet, being allocated the sector to the south-east of the German fleet. The speed of the ships of the 7th flotilla, (and those of the 5th Flotilla, patrolling the adjacent sector) was limited to less than 17 kn (20 mph; 31 km/h) by the need to minimise the production of smoke and sparks which would give their location away in any confrontation at night, and by the tiredness of their stokers, as the ships had been operating at high speeds for most of the preceding day. As the British fleet had a night cruising speed of 17 knots, this would limit the 7th Flotilla's effectiveness. As the flotilla passed through the main German fleet in preparation to beginning its search operation, S23 was illuminated by a German searchlight and fired upon, but the firing stopped when the correct recognition signals were shown.

S23 was transferred to an escort flotilla in 1918.

=== Post First World War-service ===
S23 survived the war, and was one of the twelve operational destroyers that Weimar Germany's Navy, the Reichsmarine, was allowed to retain under the Treaty of Versailles. (Note: Germany was allowed twelve operational destroyers, with four more in reserve, together with twelve operational and four reserve torpedo boats under the terms of the Versailles Treaty. Although treated as destroyers under the treaty, S23 and other ships of her type were always referred to as torpedo boats by the Germans, and the so-called "destroyers" and "torpedo boats" were managed as a single pool of torpedo craft.) S23 was commissioned into the Reichsmarine on 25 May 1921, and was allocated to the Baltic Sea.

The ship was renamed T23 on 16 March 1932, and was in reserve in 1935, when the Reichsmarine was renamed the Kriegsmarine. She was renamed again as T123 on 24 March 1939, to free up the name T23 for new construction. During 1939, T123 was converted to a control ship for the radio-target vessel (and former battleship) Hessen, gaining the name Komet, and replacing the older Pfiel, which became a torpedo recovery vessel. Komet herself became a torpedo recovery vessel in 1943.

Komet survived to the end of the Second World War, and was ceded to the Soviet Union, being delivered in January 1946. Details of Soviet use, or what name (if any) the ship used when in Soviet control, is unknown.

== Bibliography ==
- Campbell, John (1998). Jutland: An Analysis of the Fighting. London: Conway Maritime Press. ISBN 0-85177-750-3.
- Dodson, Aidan (2019). "Beyond the Kaiser: The IGN's Destroyers and Torpedo Boats After 1918". In Jordan, John (ed.). Warship 2019. Oxford, UK: Osprey Publishing. pp. 129–144. ISBN 978-1-4728-3595-6.
- Fock, Harald (1981). Schwarze Gesellen: Band 2: Zerstörer bis 1914 (in German). Herford, Germany: Koelers Verlagsgesellschaft mBH. ISBN 3-7822-0206-6.
- Fock, Harald (1989). Z-Vor! Internationale Entwicklung und Kriegseinsätze von Zerstörern und Torpedobooten 1914 bis 1939 (in German). Herford, Germany: Koehlers Verlagsgesellschaft mBH. ISBN 3-7822-0207-4.
- Gardiner, Robert; Chesneau, Robert, eds. (1980). Conway's All The World's Fighting Ships 1922–1946. London: Conway Maritime Press. ISBN 0-85177-146-7.
- Gardiner, Robert; Gray, Randal, eds. (1985). Conway's All The World's Fighting Ships 1906–1921. London: Conway Maritime Press. ISBN 0-85177-245-5.
- Gröner, Erich; Jung, Dieter; Maass, Martin (1983). Die deutschen Kriegsschiffe 1815–1945: Band 2: Torpedoboote, Zerstörer, Schnellboote, Minensuchboote, Minenräumboote (in German). Koblenz: Bernard & Graef Verlag. ISBN 3-7637-4801-6.
- Halpern, Paul G. (1994). A Naval History of World War I. London: UCL Press. ISBN 1-85728-498-4.
- Monograph No. 32: Lowestoft Raid: 24th–25th April 1916 (PDF). Naval Staff Monographs (Historical). Vol. XVI. Naval Staff, Training and Staff Duties Division. 1927.
- Rangelist der Kaiserlich Deutschen Marine für Das Jahr 1914 (in German). Berlin: Ernst Siegfried Mittler und Sohn. 1914 – via Heinrich Hein Universität Düsseldorf.
- Rollmann, Heinrich (1929). Der Krieg in der Ostsee: Zweiter Band: Das Kreigjahr 1915. Der Krieg zur See: 1914–1918 (in German). Berlin: Verlag von E. S. Mittler und Sohn.
- Tarrant, V. E. (1997). Jutland: The German Perspective. London: Arms & Armour Press. ISBN 1-85409-442-4.
