= SMS S19 (1912) =

V1-class torpedo boat of the Imperial German Navy

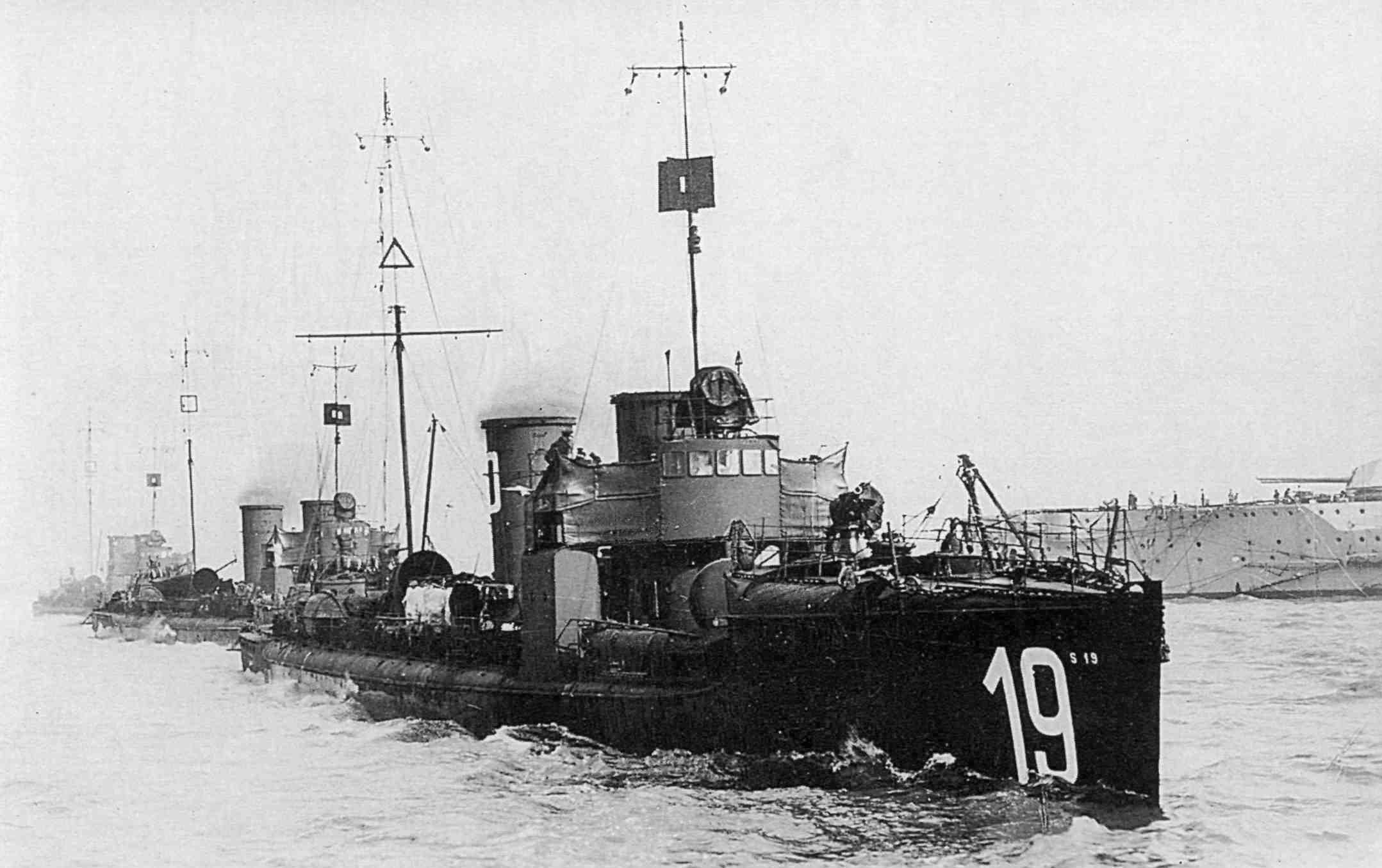

History

Germany
- Name: S19
- Builder: Schichau-Werke, Elbing
- Launched: 17 October 1912
- Commissioned: 29 March 1913
- Fate: Scrapped 1935

General characteristics
- Displacement: 697 t (686 long tons)
- Length: 71.1 m (233 ft 3 in) oa
- Beam: 7.6 m (24 ft 11 in)
- Draft: 3.11 m (10 ft 2 in)
- Propulsion: 4× water-tube boilers; 2× steam turbines; 17,000 metric horsepower (17,000 shp; 13,000 kW)
- Speed: 32 knots (59.3 km/h; 36.8 mph)
- Range: 1,190 nmi (2,200 km; 1,370 mi) at 17 knots (31 km/h; 20 mph)
- Complement: 74 officers and sailors
- Armament: 2 x 8.8 cm (3.5 in)/30 guns; 4 x 50 cm (20 in) torpedo tubes

SMS S19 (Note: "SMS" stands for "Seiner Majestät Schiff" (German: His Majesty's Ship)) (Note: The "S" in S19 denotes the shipyard at which she was built, in this case Schichau-Werke.) was a V1-class torpedo boat of the Imperial German Navy. The ship was built by Schichau-Werke, at their Elbing shipyard, completing in 1913. S19 served with the German High Seas Fleet during the First World War, taking part in the Battle of Jutland in 1916. The ship survived the war, serving in the Weimar Republic's Reichsmarine. She was scrapped in 1935.

== Construction and design ==
In 1911, the Imperial German Navy decided to break the pattern of each year's orders of torpedo boats being a development of the previous year's designs, as it felt that they were getting too big to work for the fleet, and instead the 12 torpedo boats (six each ordered from AG Vulcan and Germaniawerft (Note: The Imperial German Navy's practice was to split a year's orders into half-flotillas of six torpedo boats from different builders, to differing detailed design.)) (the V1-class) were smaller than those ordered in recent years in order to be more manoeuvrable and so work better with the fleet. This change resulted in the numbering series for torpedo boats being restarted. The 1912 programme placed orders for a flotilla of 12 torpedo boats of similar design (S13 to S24) with Schichau-Werke. The reduction in size resulted in the ships' seaworthiness being adversely affected, however, and range being reduced, with the 1911 and 1912 torpedo boats acquiring the disparaging nickname "Admiral Lans' cripples".

The Schichau boats were 71.5 m (234 ft 7 in) long overall and 71.0 m (232 ft 11 in) at the waterline, with a beam of 7.43 m (24 ft 5 in) and a draught of 2.77 m (9 ft 1 in). Displacement was 568 tonnes (559 long tons) normal and 695 tonnes (684 long tons) deep load. Three coal-fired and one oil-fired water-tube boilers fed steam to two direct-drive steam turbines rated at 15,700 metric horsepower (15,500 shp; 11,500 kW), giving a design speed of 32.5 knots (60.2 km/h; 37.4 mph). 108 tonnes (106 long tons) of coal and 72 tonnes (71 long tons) of oil were carried, giving a range of 1,050 nautical miles (1,940 km; 1,210 mi) at 17 knots (31 km/h; 20 mph) or 600 nautical miles (1,100 km; 690 mi) at 29 knots (54 km/h; 33 mph).

S19's armament consisted of two 8.8 cm (3.5 in) SK L/30 naval guns (Note: In Imperial German Navy gun nomenclature, the L/30 denotes the length of the gun. In this case, the L/30 gun is 30 caliber, meaning that the gun is 30 times as long as it is in diameter.) in single mounts fore and aft, together with four 50 cm (19.7 in) torpedo tubes with one reload torpedo carried. Up to 18 mines could be carried. The ship had a crew of 74 officers and other ranks. In 1916, the guns were replaced by more powerful 8.8 cm SK L/45 naval guns.

S19, yard number 870, was launched at Schichau's shipyard in Elbing, East Prussia (now Elbląg in Poland) on 17 October 1912 and was commissioned on 29 March 1913.

== Service ==
In May 1914, S19 was the leader of the 14th half-flotilla of the 7th Torpedo boat Flotilla.

=== First World War ===
S19 remained a member of the 14th half-flotilla of the 7th Flotilla, part of the German High Seas Fleet, at the outbreak of the First World War in August 1914. The 7th Torpedo Boat Flotilla supported the Raid on Yarmouth on 3 November 1914 and the Raid on Scarborough, Hartlepool and Whitby on 16 December 1914. On 21 April 1915, S19 was one of three torpedo-boats of the 14th half-flotilla that encountered the light cruisers of IV Scouting Group near the Weser estuary. The torpedo boat S21 collided with the cruiser Hamburg, with S21 being cut in two. The stern half of S21 remained afloat for some time, but attempts by the other two torpedo boats to take it in tow failed. S19 was damaged by the sinking S21's propeller, and had to return to port for repair. 36 men were killed in the sinking of S21. In May 1915, in support of the Gorlice–Tarnów offensive on the Eastern Front, Germany launched an attack against Libau (now Liepāja) in Latvia, with naval support from the German navy. The 14th half-flotilla, (Note: S19, S20, S22 and S23) including S19, formed part of a force of four light cruisers and 21 torpedo boats detached from the High Seas Fleet in support of the Baltic operations. They were used to prevent interference by the Russian navy with the operations, patrolling between Ösel and Gotska Sandön and between Gotska Sandön and the Swedish coast. The force detached from the High Seas Fleet was recalled to the North Sea soon after Libau was captured on 8 May.

S19, as part of the 7th Flotilla, was part of the High Seas Fleet when it sailed to cover the Lowestoft Raid on 24–25 April 1916. At the Battle of Jutland on 31 May–1 June 1916, S19 was still part of the 14th half-flotilla of the 7th Torpedo boat Flotilla, operating in support of the main German battle fleet. During the night action, the 7th Flotilla was ordered to search for and attack the British fleet, being allocated the sector to the south-east of the German fleet. The speed of the ships of the 7th flotilla, (and those of the 5th Flotilla, patrolling the adjacent sector) was limited to less than 17 kn (20 mph; 31 km/h) by the need to minimise the production of smoke and sparks which would give their location away in any confrontation at night, and by the tiredness of their stokers, as the ships had been operating at high speeds for most of the preceding day. As the British fleet had a night cruising speed of 17 knots, this would limit the 7th Flotilla's effectiveness. S19 did not encounter any British ships during the night. S19 was transferred to an escort flotilla in 1917, remaining part of the 1st half-flotilla of the 1st Escort Flotilla at the end of the First World War.

=== Postwar service ===
The Treaty of Versailles allowed the Weimar Republic's Reichsmarine to retain a total of 12 destroyers and 12 torpedo boats in active service, with a further 4 ships of each type that could be held in reserve, with no stores or ammunition on board. S19 was selected as one of the reserve destroyers, being laid up at Kiel. (Note: Although treated as destroyers under the treaty, S19 and other ships of her type were always referred to as torpedo boats by the Germans.) S19 was stricken on 31 May 1931, before being sold on 4 February 1935 and being scrapped by Deutsche Werke at their Kiel works.

== Bibliography ==
- Campbell, John (1998). Jutland: An Analysis of the Fighting. London: Conway Maritime Press. ISBN 0-85177-750-3.
- Dodson, Aidan (2019). "Beyond the Kaiser: The IGN's Destroyers and Torpedo Boats After 1918". In Jordan, John (ed.). Warship 2019. Oxford, UK: Osprey Publishing. pp. 129–144. ISBN 978-1-4728-3595-6.
- Fock, Harald (1981). Schwarze Gesellen: Band 2: Zerstörer bis 1914 (in German). Herford, Germany: Koelers Verlagsgesellschaft mBH. ISBN 3-7822-0206-6.
- Fock, Harald (1989). Z-Vor! Internationale Entwicklung und Kriegseinsätze von Zerstörern und Torpedobooten 1914 bis 1939 (in German). Herford, Germany: Koehlers Verlagsgesellschaft mBH. ISBN 3-7822-0207-4.
- Gardiner, Robert; Chesneau, Robert, eds. (1980). Conway's All The World's Fighting Ships 1922–1946. London: Conway Maritime Press. ISBN 0-85177-146-7.
- Gardiner, Robert; Gray, Randal, eds. (1985). Conway's All The World's Fighting Ships 1906–1921. London: Conway Maritime Press. ISBN 0-85177-245-5.
- Gröner, Erich; Jung, Dieter; Maass, Martin (1983). Die deutschen Kriegsschiffe 1815–1945: Band 2: Torpedoboote, Zerstörer, Schnellboote, Minensuchboote, Minenräumboote (in German). Koblenz: Bernard & Graef Verlag. ISBN 3-7637-4801-6.
- Groos, O. (1924). Der Krieg in der Nordsee: Vierter Band: Von Unfang Februar bis Dezember 1915. Der Krieg zur See: 1914–1918 (in German). Berlin: Verlag von E. S. Mittler und Sohn – via National Library of Estonia.
- Halpern, Paul G. (1994). A Naval History of World War I. London: UCL Press. ISBN 1-85728-498-4.
- Monograph No. 32: Lowestoft Raid: 24th–25th April 1916 (PDF). Naval Staff Monographs (Historical). Vol. XVI. Naval Staff, Training and Staff Duties Division. 1927.
- Rangelist der Kaiserlich Deutschen Marine für Das Jahr 1914 (in German). Berlin: Ernst Siegfried Mittler und Sohn. 1914. p. 66 – via Heinrich Hein Universität Düsseldorf.
- Rollmann, Heinrich (1929). Der Krieg in der Ostsee: Zweiter Band: Das Kreigjahr 1915. Der Krieg zur See: 1914–1918 (in German). Berlin: Verlag von E. S. Mittler und Sohn.
- Tarrant, V. E. (1997). Jutland: The German Perspective. London: Arms & Armour Press. ISBN 1-85409-442-4.
