= SMS G192 =

Torpedo boat

History

German Empire
- Name: SMS G192
- Builder: Germaniawerft, Kiel
- Launched: 5 November 1910
- Completed: 8 May 1911
- Fate: Scrapped 1922

General characteristics
- Class & type: S138-class torpedo boat
- Displacement: 660 t (650 long tons) design
- Length: 74.0 m (242 ft 9 in) o/a
- Beam: 7.06 m (23 ft 2 in)
- Draught: 3.1 m (10 ft 2 in)
- Installed power: 18,200 PS (18,000 shp; 13,400 kW)
- Propulsion: 3 × boilers; 2 × steam turbines
- Speed: 32 kn (37 mph; 59 km/h)
- Complement: 84
- Armament: 2× 8.8 cm guns; 4× 50 cm torpedo tubes

SMS G192 (Note: "SMS" stands for "Seiner Majestät Schiff" (transl. His Majesty's Ship)) (Note: The "G" in G192 denoted the shipbuilder who constructed her.) was a S-138-class large torpedo boat of the Imperial German Navy. She was built by the Germaniawerft shipyard at Kiel between 1910 and 1911, and was launched on 5 November 1910, entering service in 1911.

G192 served throughout the First World War. After the war, she was surrendered as a war reparation, and was scrapped in 1921.

== Design ==
The Imperial German Navy ordered 12 large torpedo boats (Große Torpedoboote) as part of the fiscal year 1910 shipbuilding programme, with one half-flotilla of six ships ordered from Germaniawerft and the other six ships from AG Vulcan. As with normal practice for the German Navy, the two groups of torpedo boats of basically similar layout but differed slightly in detailed design, with the designs showing a gradual pattern of refinements and increase in displacement with each year's orders.

The 1910 Germaniawerft torpedo boats were 74.0 metres (242 ft 9 in) long overall and 73.6 metres (241 ft 6 in) between perpendiculars, with a beam of 7.06 metres (23 ft 2 in) and a draught of 3.1 metres (10 ft 2 in). The ships displaced 660 tonnes (650 long tons) design and 810 tonnes (800 long tons) deep load.

Three coal-fired and one oil-fired water-tube boiler fed steam at a pressure of 18.5 standard atmospheres (272 psi) to two sets of direct-drive steam turbines. The ship's machinery was rated at 18,200 PS (18,000 shp; 13,400 kW) giving a design speed of 32 knots (37 mph; 59 km/h), with members of the class reaching a speed of 33.5 knots (38.6 mph; 62.0 km/h) during sea trials. 145 tons of coal and 76 tons of oil fuel were carried, giving an endurance of 2,590 nautical miles (2,980 mi; 4,800 km) at 12 knots (14 mph; 22 km/h), 1,150 nautical miles (1,320 mi; 2,130 km) at 17 knots (20 mph; 31 km/h) or 420 nautical miles (480 mi; 780 km) at 30 knots (35 mph; 56 km/h).

The ships were armed with two 8.8 cm L/45 guns, (Note: Both Conway's All The World's Fighting Ships and Jane's Fighting Ships claim L/30 guns were fitted.) one on the forecastle and one aft. Four single 50 cm (19.7 in) torpedo tubes were fitted, with two on the ship's beam in the gap between the forecastle and the ship's bridge which were capable of firing straight ahead, one between the ship's two funnels, and one aft of the funnels. The ship had a crew of 84 officers and men.

== Construction and service ==
G192 was laid down at Germaniawerft's Kiel shipyard as Yard number 151 and was launched on 5 November 1910 and was completed on 8 May 1911.

On commissioning, G192 joined the 2nd half flotilla of the 1st Torpedo Boat Flotilla. G192 remained part of the 2nd half flotilla through 1913 and into 1914.

=== First World War ===
G192 remained part of the 2nd half-flotilla of the 1st Torpedo Boat Flotilla on the outbreak of the First World War in August 1914. On 23 August 1915, G192, along with G194 and G196, escorted the newly commissioned battlecruiser Lützow from Danzig to Kiel, arriving at their destination on 24 August. On 11 September 1915, the German cruisers Stralsund and Regensburg set out from Wilhelmshaven to lay a minefield off the Swarte Bank in the North Sea, with the High Seas Fleet sailing in support. On the return trip, at 01:50 hr on 12 September, the High Seas Fleet ran into a newly laid British minefield, with the torpedo boat G196 striking a mine which badly damaged the ship's stern, killing seven and wounding eight of G196's crew. G192 and sister ship G195 went alongside the stricken torpedo boat, passing steel lines under G196 while the dead and wounded were transferred to G195. As G196 was thought to be in danger of sinking, torpedoes and ammunition was moved over to G192 and G195 and oil fuel was pumped off. G196 was stabilised by the efforts of the chief engineers of the three torpedo boats, with G192 and G195 remaining alongside G196 while V189 towed the ship back to Wilhelmshaven.

On 25 March 1916, the British seaplane carrier Vindex, escorted by the Harwich force, launched an air attack against a Zeppelin base believed to be at Hoyer on the coast of Schleswig. The raid was a failure, with the airship base actually at Tondern, and while engaging German patrol boats, the British destroyer HMS Medusa was rammed by the destroyer HMS Laverock and badly damaged. (Medusa was later abandoned and eventually sank). Forces of the High Seas Fleet were ordered to sea in response to the attack, and on the evening of 25 March, 18 German torpedo boats of the 1st and 6th Torpedo Boat Flotillas, including G192 were deployed in a wide front with orders to search for Medusa to the North West of Horns Rev. Two of the ships of the 1st Flotilla, G193 and G194 encountered a group of British cruisers, with G194 being rammed and sunk by the cruiser Cleopatra. Cleopatra was then rammed by the cruiser Undaunted. Another German group, deployed in a westward search lost the torpedo boat S22 to a mine. The search was abandoned owing to the heavy seas, which were bad enough that the torpedo boats could not keep and effective lookout or use their armament. G192, still part of the 1st Torpedo Boat Flotilla, was part of the High Seas Fleet when it sailed to cover the Lowestoft Raid on 24–25 April 1916, but did not take part in the Battle of Jutland on 31 May–1 June 1916, as one of seven older torpedo boats of the 1st Torpedo Boat Flotilla left behind. G192 remained part of the 1st Torpedo Boat Flotilla on 19 August 1916, when the High Seas Fleet sailed to cover a sortie of the battlecruisers of the 1st Scouting Group in the inconclusive Action of 19 August 1916.

On 22 February 1918 the ship was renamed T192, in order to free her number for new construction, in this case the destroyer H192 which was ordered from Howaldswerke, but was cancelled before starting construction. In November 1918, at the end of the war, T192 was a member of the 15th half flotilla of the 8th Torpedo Boat Flotilla.

=== Disposal ===
After the end of the war, T192 initially remained under the control of the Weimar Republic's navy, the Reichsmarine, but after the scuttling of the German fleet at Scapa Flow on 21 June 1919, was surrendered under the terms of Treaty of Versailles to compensate for the scuttled ships. T192 was one of 20 German torpedo boats delivered to Cherbourg in France for consideration by France and Italy for incorporation into their navies, but was not wanted by either navy. The unwanted ships were to be scrapped by Britain, and T192 was sold on 22 October 1921 and was scrapped at Chatham in 1922.
