= SMS G175 =

History

Germany
- Name: G175 1910 until February 1912, March 1912–22 February 1918; Sleipner February–March 1912; T175 from 22 February 1918
- Builder: Germaniawerft, Kiel
- Launched: 24 February 1910
- Commissioned: 4 December 1910
- Fate: Scrapped 1926

General characteristics
- Class & type: S138-class torpedo boat
- Displacement: 650 t (640 long tons) design
- Length: 74.0 m (242 ft 9 in) o/a
- Beam: 7.9 m (25 ft 11 in)
- Draught: 3.04–3.28 m (10 ft 0 in – 10 ft 9 in)
- Installed power: 15,000 PS (15,000 shp; 11,000 kW)
- Propulsion: 4 × boilers; 2 × steam turbines
- Speed: 32 knots (59 km/h; 37 mph)
- Complement: 84
- Armament: 2 × 8.8 cm guns; 4 × 50 cm torpedo tubes

SMS G175 (Note: "SMS" stands for "Seiner Majestät Schiff" (transl. His Majesty's Ship)) (Note: The "G" in S176 denoted the shipbuilder who constructed her, in this case Germaniawerft.) was a S138-class large torpedo boat of the Imperial German Navy. She was built by Germaniawerft at Kiel in 1909–1910, launching on 24 February 1910 and completing on 6 July that year.

G175 served throughout the First World War, operating mainly in the Baltic Sea, and took part in Operation Albion, the German invasion and occupation of the West Estonian Archipelago in 1917. She was renamed T175 on 22 February 1918, and ended the war as an escort vessel. After the war, T175 was retained by the Weimar Republic's navy, the Reichsmarine, being maintained as a reserve ship until she was stricken in 1926 and sold for scrap.

== Construction and design ==
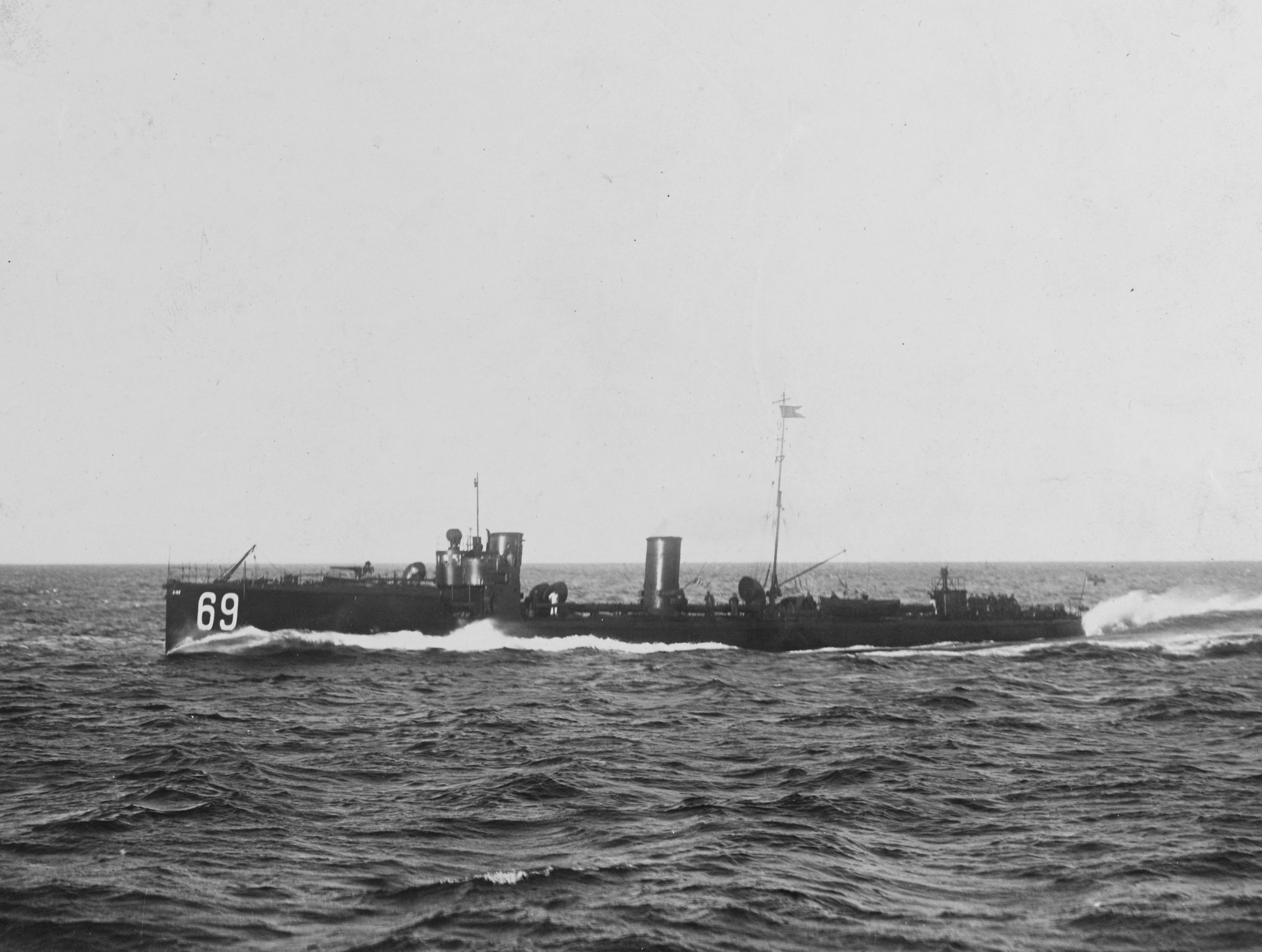
Sister ship G169

The Imperial German Navy ordered 12 large torpedo boats (Große Torpedoboote) as part of the fiscal year 1909 shipbuilding programme, with two ships (G174 and G175) ordered from Germaniawerft, four (S176–S179) from Schichau-Werke and the remaining six ships (V180–V185) from AG Vulcan. The orders were split between the three shipyards in order to manage the workload and ensure continuous employment at all three companies. The two Germania-built torpedo boats had similar hulls to those of the Germania torpedo boats built under the previous years construction programme (G169–G173), but had different machinery.

G175 was 74.0 metres (242 ft 9 in) long overall and at the waterline, with a beam of 7.9 metres (25 ft 11 in) and a draught of between 3.04 m (10 ft 0 in) forward and 3.28 m (10 ft 9 in) aft. The ship displaced 700 tonnes (690 long tons) design and 824 tonnes (811 long tons) full load. Three coal-fired and one oil-fired water-tube boilers fed steam at a pressure of 18 atm (260 psi) to two sets of Parsons direct-drive steam turbines, which drove two shafts, each with a 2.25 m (7 ft 5 in) propeller. The machinery was rated at 15,000 shp (11,000 kW), giving a design speed of 32 kn (37 mph; 59 km/h).

The ship was armed with two 8.8 cm SK L/30 guns, (Note: SK stood for Schnellfeuerkanone (quick-firing gun) or Schnellade-Kanone (fast-loading gun).) (Note: In Imperial German Navy gun nomenclature, the L/30 denotes the length of the gun. In this case, the L/30 gun is 30 caliber, meaning that the gun barrel has an overall length 30 times greater than the gun's bore.) one on the forecastle and one aft. The guns were later replaced by 8.8 cm SK L/45 guns. Four single 50 cm (19.7 in) torpedo tubes were fitted, with two on the ship's beam in the gap behind the ship's bridge and fore funnel, and two aft of the second funnel. The ship had a crew of 3 officers and 81 other ranks.

G175 was laid down at Germaniawerft's Kiel shipyard as yard number 146 and was launched on 24 February 1910. She was commissioned on 4 December 1910.

== Service ==
In May 1911, G175 was a member of the 11th half-flotilla of the 6th Torpedo Boat Flotilla. From February to March 1912, the ship served as the despatch boat Sleipner, (Note: Both prior and after this brief renaming of G175, the name Sleipner was carried by the former torpedo boat S97, which served as a despatch boat to the German Emperor Wilhelm II's yacht Hohenzollern.) and then returned to her old name of G175, and to the 11th half-flotilla. G175 visited Tunis on 12 May 1912, and Southampton on 22 May 1912. G175 remained a member of the 11th half-flotilla in 1913, although this was now a reserve formation.

=== First World War ===
The Imperial German Navy mobilised on 1 August 1914, owing to the imminent outbreak of the First World War, but G175 had not been reactivated as part of the initial round of recommissioning by 10 August, although she had joined the 16th half-flotilla of the 8th Torpedo Boat Flotilla by mid October that year. In October 1914 the 8th Torpedo Boat flotilla, including G175, was temporarily detached to the Baltic Sea as part of a large scale deployment of torpedo boats from both the High Seas Fleet and training units to counter operations of British submarines in the Baltic. The 8th Flotilla returned to the North Sea at the end of the month.

The 8th Torpedo Boat flotilla, including G175, was deployed to the Baltic together with the pre-dreadnought battleships of the IV Battle Squadron as temporary reinforcements in July 1915. On 10–11 July, G175 was part of the escort for a large sortie by battleships and armoured cruisers to the north of Gotland. On 16 July, G175, together with S177 and V180 was sent to search for a ditched aircraft, with the torpedo boats advancing towards Lyserort, Latvia before S177 picked up the missing aircraft. On 19 July 1915, G175 was one of eight torpedo boats of the 8th Flotilla that escorted the battleships Braunschweig and Elsass and the cruisers Roon and Lübeck on a sortie westwards out of Libau (now Liepāja, Latvia). The formation ran into a fog bank, and G175 had a minor collision with Elsass. G175's bow was damaged, causing flooding forward, and the torpedo boat was therefore detached from the operation to return to Danzig. The 8th Torpedo Boat Flotilla continued to operate in the Baltic for the rest of July 1915, and by August that year was formally considered part of the German Baltic Fleet. That month, the German Baltic Fleet, supported by a large portion of the High Seas Fleet, launched a major operation (later called the Battle of the Gulf of Riga) in the Gulf of Riga in support of the advance of German troops. It was planned to enter the gulf via the Irben Strait, defeating any Russian naval forces and mining the entrance to Moon Sound. The 8th Flotilla supported these operations.

Following supporting a minelaying operation by the minelayer Deutschland on 2/3 May 1916, G175 and the torpedo boat S143 hit the wreck of a sunken ship off the northern entrance to Libau. Both torpedo boats had to be sent to a shipyard for repair. G175 remained a member of the 16th half-flotilla of the 8th Torpedo Boat Flotilla in May 1916.

In October 1917, the Germans carried out Operation Albion, an amphibious assault to capture Ösel and Muhu islands off the coast of Estonia. G175 was part of the 19th half-flotilla of the 10th Torpedo Boat flotilla during these operations.

On 22 February 1918, G175 was renamed T175 in order to free up her number for new construction, in this case the 1918 Mobilisation type V175, which was broken up on the stocks following the end of the war. The October Revolution in Russia and the subsequent Armistice between Russia and the Central Powers allowed the release of forces from the Baltic to the North Sea, and by the end of April 1918, T176 had returned to the High Seas Fleet, and was back as a member of the as part of the 16th half-flotilla of the 8th Flotilla. The need to escort German U-boats through minefields in the German Bight resulted in the formation of large escort flotillas early in 1918, and by the end of the war, T175 had joined the 1st half-flotilla of the 1st Escort Flotilla. (Note: The 1st Escort Flotilla consisted of three half flotillas, the 1st, 2nd and 3rd, with 13, 12 and 11 torpedo boats respectively.)

=== Post war ===
Following the end of the war, a large proportion of the German Fleet, including 50 modern torpedo boats, were interned at Scapa Flow, but T175 remained under German control both then and when the Treaty of Versailles required more ships to be surrendered. The treaty allowed the Weimar Republic's new navy, the Reichsmarine an active force of only twelve destroyers and twelve torpedo boats, with a further four more of each type in reserve, with guns mounted, but without stores or ammunition. T175 was selected as one of the four reserve destroyers. (Note: While the retained ships were divided into destroyers and torpedo boats under the requirements of the treaty, the Reichsmarine considered them all as torpedo boats.) The completion of the six Type 23 torpedo boats from 1926 resulted in the replacement of six of the older ships, with T176 being stricken on 23 September 1926, replaced by Möwe, the first Type 23 torpedo boat. T175 was sold for 63000 Reichsmark and broken up in Hamburg.

== Bibliography ==
- Chesneau, Roger; Kolesnik, Eugene M., eds. (1979). Conway's All The World's Fighting Ships 1860–1905. London: Conway Maritime Press. ISBN 0-85177-133-5.
- Dodson, Aidan (2019). "Beyond the Kaiser: The IGN's Destroyers and Torpedo Boats After 1918". In Jordan, John (ed.). Warship 2019. Oxford, UK: Osprey Publishing. pp. 129–144. ISBN 978-1-4728-3595-6.
- Firle, Rudolph (1921). Der Krieg in der Ostsee: Erster Band: Von Kriegsbeginn bis Mitte März 1915. Der Krieg zur See: 1914–1918 (in German). Berlin: Verlag von E. S. Mittler und Sohn.
- Fock, Harald (1981). Schwarze Gesellen: Band 2: Zerstörer bis 1914 (in German). Herford, Germany: Koelers Verlagsgesellschaft mBH. ISBN 3-7822-0206-6.
- Fock, Harald (1989). Z-Vor! Internationale Entwicklung und Kriegseinsätze von Zerstörern und Torpedobooten 1914 bis 1939 (in German). Herford, Germany: Koehlers Verlagsgesellschaft mBH. ISBN 3-7822-0207-4.
- Friedman, Norman (2011). Naval Weapons of World War One: Guns, Torpedoes, Mines and ASW Weapons of All Nations: An Illustrated Directory. Barnsley, UK: Seaforth Publishing. ISBN 978-1-84832-100-7.
- von Gagern, Ernst (1962). Der Krieg in der Ostsee: Dritter Band: Von Anfang 1916 bis zum Kriegsende (in German). Frankfurt: Verlag von E.S. Mittler & Sohn.
- Gardiner, Robert; Gray, Randal, eds. (1985). Conway's All The World's Fighting Ships 1906–1921. London: Conway Maritime Press. ISBN 0-85177-245-5.
- Gladisch, Walter, ed. (1965). Der Krieg in der Nordsee: Band 7: Vom Sommer 1917 bis zum Kriegsende 1918. Der Krieg zur See: 1914–1918. Frankfurt: Verlag E.S. Mittler & Sohn.
- Gröner, Erich; Jung, Dieter; Maass, Martin (1983). Die deutschen Kriegsschiffe 1815–1945: Band 2: Torpedoboote, Zerstörer, Schnellboote, Minensuchboote, Minenräumboote (in German). Koblenz: Bernard & Graef Verlag. ISBN 3-7637-4801-6.
- Gröner, Erich; Jung, Dieter; Maass, Martin (1990). German Warships 1915–1945: Volume One: Major Surface Vessels. Annapolis, Maryland, US: Naval Institute Press. ISBN 0-87021-790-9.
- Groos, O. (1920). Der Krieg in der Nordsee: Erster Band: Von Kreigsbeginn bis Anfang September 1914. Der Krieg zur See: 1914–1918 (in German). Berlin: Verlag von E. S. Mittler und Sohn – via National Library of Estonia.
- Halpern, Paul G. (1994). A Naval History of World War I. London: UCL Press. ISBN 1-85728-498-4.
- Hildebrand, Hans H.; Röhr, Albert; Steinmetz, Hans-Otto (1980). Die Deutschen Kriegschiffe: Biographen — ein Spiegel der Marinegeschichte von 1815 bis zur Gegenwart: Band 2 (in German). Herford, Germany: Koehlers Verlagsgesellschaft MBH. ISBN 3-7822-0210-4.
- Hildebrand, Hans H.; Röhr, Albert; Steinmetz, Hans-Otto (1983). Die Deutschen Kriegschiffe: Biographen — ein Spiegel der Marinegeschichte von 1815 bis zur Gegenwart: Band 7 (in German). Herford, Germany: Koehlers Verlagsgesellschaft MBH. ISBN 3-7822-0267-8.
- Moore, John (1990). Jane's Fighting Ships of World War I. London: Studio. ISBN 1-85170-378-0.
- Rollmann, Heinrich (1929). Der Krieg in der Ostsee: Zweiter Band: Das Kreigjahr 1915. Der Krieg zur See: 1914–1918 (in German). Berlin: Verlag von E. S. Mittler und Sohn.
- Stoelzel, Albert (1930). Ehrenrangliste der Kaiserlich Deutschen Marine 1914–1918 (in German). Berlin: Thormann & Goetsch.
