= SMS G197 =

History

German Empire
- Name: SMS G197
- Builder: Germaniawerft, Kiel
- Launched: 23 June 1911
- Completed: 10 November 1911
- Fate: Scrapped 1921

General characteristics
- Class & type: S138-class torpedo boat
- Displacement: 660 t (650 long tons) design
- Length: 74.0 m (242 ft 9 in) o/a
- Beam: 7.06 m (23 ft 2 in)
- Draught: 3.1 m (10 ft 2 in)
- Installed power: 18,200 PS (18,000 shp; 13,400 kW)
- Propulsion: 3 × boilers; 2 × steam turbines
- Speed: 32 kn (37 mph; 59 km/h)
- Complement: 84
- Armament: 2× 8.8 cm guns; 4× 50 cm torpedo tubes

SMS G197 (Note: "SMS" stands for "Seiner Majestät Schiff" (transl. His Majesty's Ship)) (Note: The "G" in G197 denoted the shipbuilder who constructed her.) was a S-138-class large torpedo boat of the Imperial German Navy. She was built by the Germaniawerft shipyard at Kiel between 1910 and 1911, and was launched on 23 June 1911, entering service later that year.

G197 served throughout the First World War, taking part in the Battle of Heligoland Bight in August 1914 and the Battle of the Gulf of Riga in August 1915. After the war, she was surrendered as a war reparation, and was scrapped in 1921.

== Construction and design ==
The Imperial German Navy ordered 12 large torpedo boats (Große Torpedoboote) as part of the fiscal year 1910 shipbuilding programme, with one half-flotilla of six ships ordered from Germaniawerft and the other six ships from AG Vulcan. The two groups of torpedo boats were of basically similar layout but differed slightly in detailed design, with a gradual evolution of design and increase in displacement with each year's orders.

G197 was 74.0 metres (242 ft 9 in) long overall and 73.6 metres (241 ft 6 in) between perpendiculars, with a beam of 7.06 metres (23 ft 2 in) and a draught of 3.1 metres (10 ft 2 in). The ship displaced 660 tonnes (650 long tons) design and 810 tonnes (800 long tons) deep load.

Three coal-fired and one oil-fired water-tube boiler fed steam at a pressure of 18.5 standard atmospheres (272 psi) to two sets of direct-drive steam turbines. The ship's machinery was rated at 18,200 PS (18,000 shp; 13,400 kW) giving a design speed of 32 knots (37 mph; 59 km/h), with members of the class reaching a speed of 33.5 knots (38.6 mph; 62.0 km/h) during sea trials. 145 tons of coal and 76 tons of oil fuel were carried, giving an endurance of 2,590 nautical miles (2,980 mi; 4,800 km) at 12 knots (14 mph; 22 km/h), 1,150 nautical miles (1,320 mi; 2,130 km) at 17 knots (20 mph; 31 km/h) or 420 nautical miles (480 mi; 780 km) at 30 knots (35 mph; 56 km/h).

The ship was armed with two 8.8 cm L/45 guns, (Note: Both Conway's All The World's Fighting Ships and Jane's Fighting Ships claim L/30 guns were fitted.) one on the forecastle and one aft. Four single 50 cm (19.7 in) torpedo tubes were fitted, with two on the ship's beam in the gap between the forecastle and the ship's bridge which were capable of firing straight ahead, one between the ship's two funnels, and one aft of the funnels. The ship had a crew of 84 officers and men.

G197 was laid down at Germaniawerft's Kiel shipyard as Yard number 157 and was launched on 23 June 1911 and completed on 10 November 1911.

== Service ==
On commissioning, G197 joined the 1st Half Flotilla of the 1st Torpedo Boat Flotilla. G197 remained part of the 1st Half Flotilla through 1913 and into 1914.

=== First World War ===
G197 remained part of the 1st Half Flotilla of the 1st Torpedo Boat Flotilla on 10 August 1914. On 28 August 1914, the British Harwich Force, supported by light cruisers and battlecruisers of the Grand Fleet, carried out a raid towards Heligoland with the intention of destroying patrolling German torpedo boats. The German defensive patrols around Heligoland consisted of the 1st Torpedo Boat Flotilla of 12 torpedo boats forming an outer patrol line about 25 nautical miles (29 mi; 46 km) North and West of Heligoland, with an inner line of older torpedo boats of the 3rd Minesweeping Division at about 12 nautical miles (14 mi; 22 km). Four German light cruisers and another flotilla of modern torpedo boats (5th Torpedo Boat Flotilla) was in the vicinity of Heligoland. G197 formed part of the outer screen of torpedo boats. At about 06:00 on 28 August, G194, another member of the outer screen reported spotting the periscope of a submarine. As a result, the 5th Torpedo Boat Flotilla was ordered out to hunt the hostile submarine. At 07:57 G194 was fired on by British warships, and was soon retreating towards Heligoland, pursued by four British destroyers. V Flotilla and the old torpedo boats of the 3rd Minesweeping Division also came under British fire, and were only saved by the intervention of the German cruisers Stettin and Frauenlob, with the torpedo boats V1, D8 and T33 damaged. G197 managed to successfully avoid the British ships and returned to base. However, sister ship V187, leader of I Flotilla, ran into the midst of the Harwich force when trying to return to Heligoland and was sunk. The intervention of the supporting British forces resulted in the sinking of the German cruisers Mainz, Cöln and Ariadne. The British light cruiser Arethusa and destroyers Laurel, Laertes and Liberty were badly damaged but safely returned to base.

On the evening of 12 April 1915, the German airship L7 sighted a British light cruiser and five surfaced submarines in the Heligoland Bight. I Flotilla was ordered out to attack the submarines, but G197, V188 and V189 collided in thick fog, disabling the three ships and causing the sortie to be aborted. In August 1915 the Germans detached a large portion of the High Seas Fleet for operations in the Gulf of Riga in support of the advance of German troops. It was planned to enter the Gulf via the Irben Strait, defeating any Russian naval forces and mining the entrance to Moon Sound. G197 took part in these operations, opening fire at what was believed to be a periscope of an enemy submarine when escorting the battlecruiser Seydlitz on 10 August. The operation was not a success, with Germany losing the torpedo boats S31 and V99 and the minesweeper T46, while failing to destroy any major Russian warships or lay the planned minefield.

G197, still part of the 1st Torpedo Boat Flotilla, was part of the High Seas Fleet when it sailed to cover the Lowestoft Raid on 24–25 April 1916. She did not take part in the Battle of Jutland on 31 May–1 June 1916, with seven older torpedo boats of the 1st Torpedo Boat Flotilla being left behind. G197 remained part of the 1st Torpedo Boat Flotilla on 19 August 1916, when the High Seas Fleet sailed to cover a sortie of the battlecruisers of the 1st Scouting Group in the inconclusive Action of 19 August 1916.

G197 joined an escort flotilla in 1918 and on 22 February 1918, was renamed T197, in order to free her number for new construction, in this case the destroyer H197 which was ordered from Howaldswerke, but was cancelled at the end of the war. She remained a member of the 1st Half-flotilla of the 1st Escort Flotilla at the end of the war. (Note: The 1st Escort Flotilla comprised three Half-flotillas, with a total of 36 torpedo boats operated.)

=== Disposal ===
After the end of the war, T197 initially remained under the control of the Weimar Republic's navy, the Reichsmarine, but after the scuttling of the German fleet at Scapa Flow on 21 June 1919, was surrendered under the terms of Treaty of Versailles to compensate for the scuttled ships. T197 was one of 20 German torpedo boats delivered to Cherbourg in France for consideration by France and Italy for incorporation into their navies, but was not wanted by either navy. The unwanted ships were to be scrapped by Britain, and T197 was sold on 22 October 1921 and was scrapped at Briton Ferry in Wales in 1921.

== Bibliography ==
- Campbell, John (1998). Jutland: An Analysis of the Fighting. London: Conway Maritime Press. ISBN 0-85177-750-3.
- Chesneau, Roger; Kolesnik, Eugene M., eds. (1979). Conway's All The World's Fighting Ships 1860–1905. London: Conway Maritime Press. ISBN 0-85177-133-5.
- Dodson, Aidan (2019). "Beyond the Kaiser: The IGN's Destroyers and Torpedo Boats After 1918". In Jordan, John (ed.). Warship 2019. Oxford, UK: Osprey Publishing. pp. 129–144. ISBN 978-1-4728-3595-6.
- Fock, Harald (1989). Z-Vor! Internationale Entwicklung und Kriegseinsätze von Zerstörern und Torpedobooten 1914 bis 1939 (in German). Herford, Germany: Koehlers Verlagsgesellschaft mBH. ISBN 3-7822-0207-4.
- Gardiner, Robert; Gray, Randal, eds. (1985). Conway's All The World's Fighting Ships 1906–1921. London: Conway Maritime Press. ISBN 0-85177-245-5.
- Groos, O. (1924). Der Krieg in der Nordsee: Vierter Band: Von Anfang Februar bis Ende Dezember 1915. Der Krieg zur See: 1914–1918 (in German). Berlin: Verlag von E. S. Mittler und Sohn – via National Library of Estonia.
- Gröner, Erich; Jung, Dieter; Maass, Martin (1983). Die deutschen Kriegsschiffe 1815–1945: Band 2: Torpedoboote, Zerstörer, Schnellboote, Minensuchboote, Minenräumboote (in German). Koblenz: Bernard & Graef Verlag. ISBN 3-7637-4801-6.
- Halpern, Paul G. (1994). A Naval History of World War I. London: UCL Press. ISBN 1-85728-498-4.
- Moore, John (1990). Jane's Fighting Ships of World War I. London: Studio. ISBN 1-85170-378-0.
- Massie, Robert K. (2007). Castles of Steel: Britain, Germany and the Winning of the Great War at Sea. London: Vintage Books. ISBN 978-0-099-52378-9.
- Monograph No. 11: The Battle of the Heligoland Bight, August 28th, 1914 (PDF). Naval Staff Monographs (Historical). Vol. III. Naval Staff, Training and Staff Duties Division. 1921. pp. 108–166.
- Monograph No. 29: Home Waters—Part IV.: From February to May 1915 (PDF). Naval Staff Monographs (Historical). Vol. XIII. Naval Staff, Training and Staff Duties Division. 1925.
- Monograph No. 32: Lowestoft Raid: 24th–25th April 1916 (PDF). Naval Staff Monographs (Historical). Vol. XVI. Naval Staff, Training and Staff Duties Division. 1927.
- Monograph No. 33: Home Waters: Part VII: From June 1916 to November 1916 (PDF). Naval Staff Monographs (Historical). Vol. XVII. Naval Staff, Training and Staff Duties Division. 1927.
- Rollmann, Heinrich (1929). Der Krieg in der Ostsee: Zwieter Band: Das Kriegjahr 1915. Der Krieg zur See: 1914–1918. Berlin: Verlag von E.S. Mittler & Sohn.
