= S138-class torpedo boat =

Class of German torpedo boat destroyers

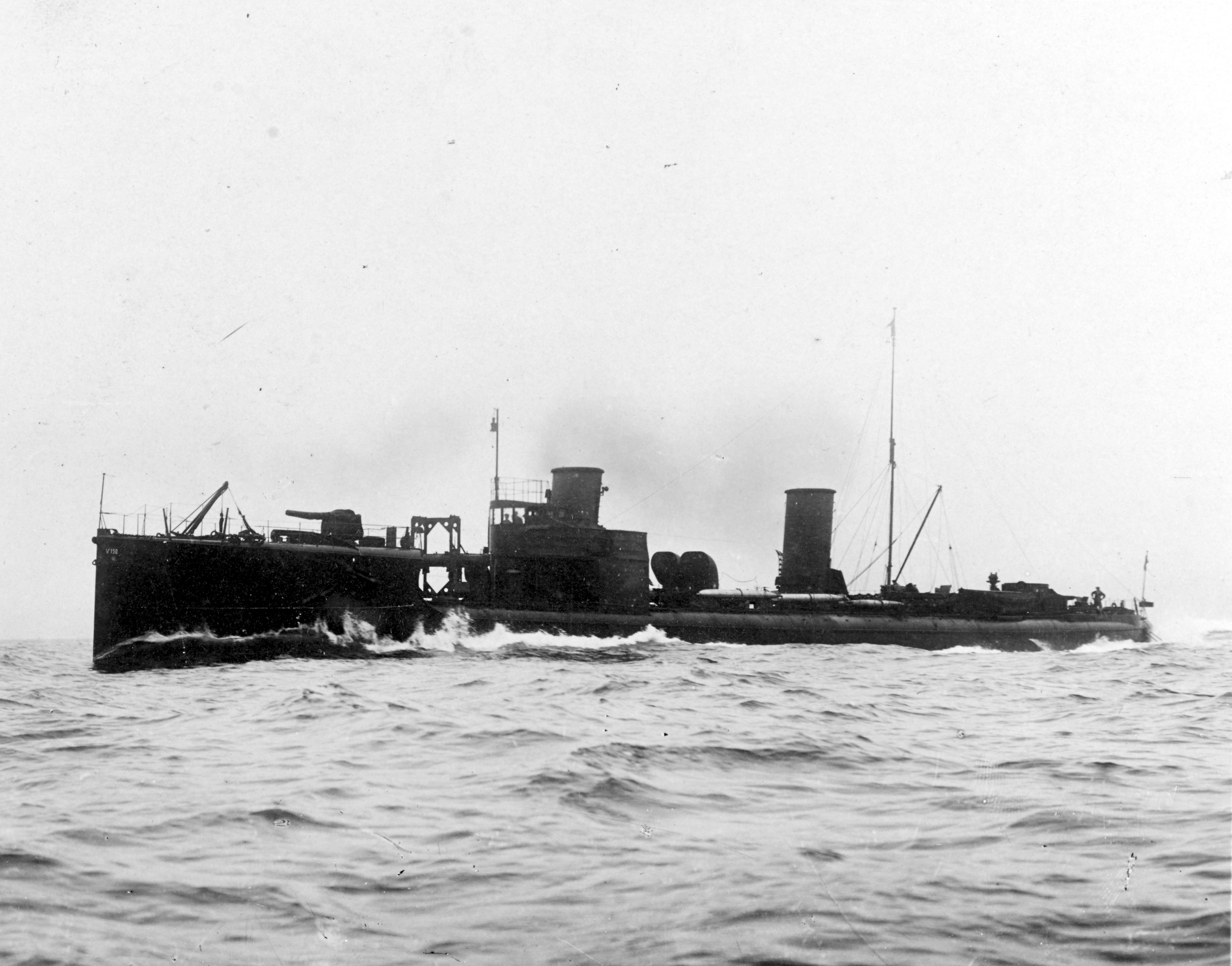
- SMS V150 underway c. 1908

Class overview
- Builders: Schichau (S), AG Vulcan (V), Germaniawerft (G)
- Operators: Imperial German Navy; Ottoman Navy
- Preceded by: S90 class
- Built: 1906–1911
- In commission: 1907–1945
- Completed: 65

General characteristics
- Type: Torpedo boat
- Displacement: 533 to 700 tonnes (525 to 689 long tons) designed; 684 to 824 tonnes (673 to 811 long tons) full load
- Length: 70.7 to 74.2 m (231 ft 11 in to 243 ft 5 in) o/a
- Beam: 7.8 to 7.9 m (26 to 26 ft)
- Draft: 2.75 to 3.06 m (9 ft 0 in to 10 ft 0 in) (forward)
- Installed power: S138–V160: 4 × coal-fired water tube boilers; 10,500 to 10,800 indicated horsepower (10,600 to 11,000 PS) (Note: V161's turbines were rated substantially higher, at 14,600 shaft horsepower (14,800 PS).); V162–G197: 3 × coal-fired water tube boilers; 1 × oil-fired water tube boiler; 14,800 to 17,400 shaft horsepower (15,000 to 17,600 PS)
- Propulsion: S138–V160: 2-shaft VTE; V161–S168, G173–197: 2-shaft steam turbines; G169–172: 3-shaft steam turbines
- Speed: 30 to 32 kn (56 to 59 km/h; 35 to 37 mph)
- Complement: 3 officers; 77–81 enlisted
- Armament: S138–149: 1 × 8.8 cm (3.46 in) SK L/35 gun; 3 × 5 cm (2.0 in) SK L/40 guns; 3 × 45 cm (17.7 in) torpedo tubes; V150–155: 2 × 8.8 cm SK L/35 guns; 3 × 45 cm torpedo tubes; V156–G197: 1 × 8.8 cm (3.46 in) SK L/35 gun; 2 × 5.2 cm (2 in) SK L/55 guns; 3 × 46 cm torpedo tubes (Note: From G174 through G197, the vessels carried four 50 cm (20 in) torpedo tubes.)

The S138 class was a group of sixty-five torpedo boats built for the German Kaiserliche Marine (Imperial Navy) and the Ottoman Navy in the early 1900s. Almost all of the boats served with the German fleet, with only four being sold to the Ottoman Empire in 1910. The German and Ottoman boats saw action in World War I, and several were lost. One Ottoman boat successfully torpedoed and sank a British battleship in 1915. In 1917 and 1918, the German members of the class were all renamed to replace the builder prefix with a standardized "T" prefix. Following Germany's defeat, many of the members of the S138 class were scrapped, either after having been seized as war prizes by the victorious Allied powers or by Germany to comply with the naval disarmament clauses of the Treaty of Versailles. Some boats continued in German service through World War II, after which the surviving vessels were all seized as war prizes.

== Design ==
=== General characteristics and machinery ===
The boats of the S138 class varied in dimensions, and they gradually increased in size as more vessels were built. The boats were 70.2 to 74 meters (230 ft 4 in to 242 ft 9 in) long at the waterline and 70.7 to 74.2 m (231 ft 11 in to 243 ft 5 in) long overall. They had beam (nautical) of 7.8 to 7.9 m (25 ft 7 in to 25 ft 11 in) and a draft of 2.75 to 3.06 m (9 ft 0 in to 10 ft 0 in) forward. The hull for each boat was divided into thirteen watertight compartments, though after V150, they were reduced to twelve compartments. They had a crew of three officers and seventy-seven enlisted men, though from V150 onward, they had larger crews, with eighty-one enlisted men aboard. When serving as half-flotilla flagships, the boats would have a flotilla leader's staff of four officers and nine enlisted men in addition to the standard crew. The vessels carried a yawl and a dinghy apiece, though later in their careers they carried up to three yawls and the dinghy.

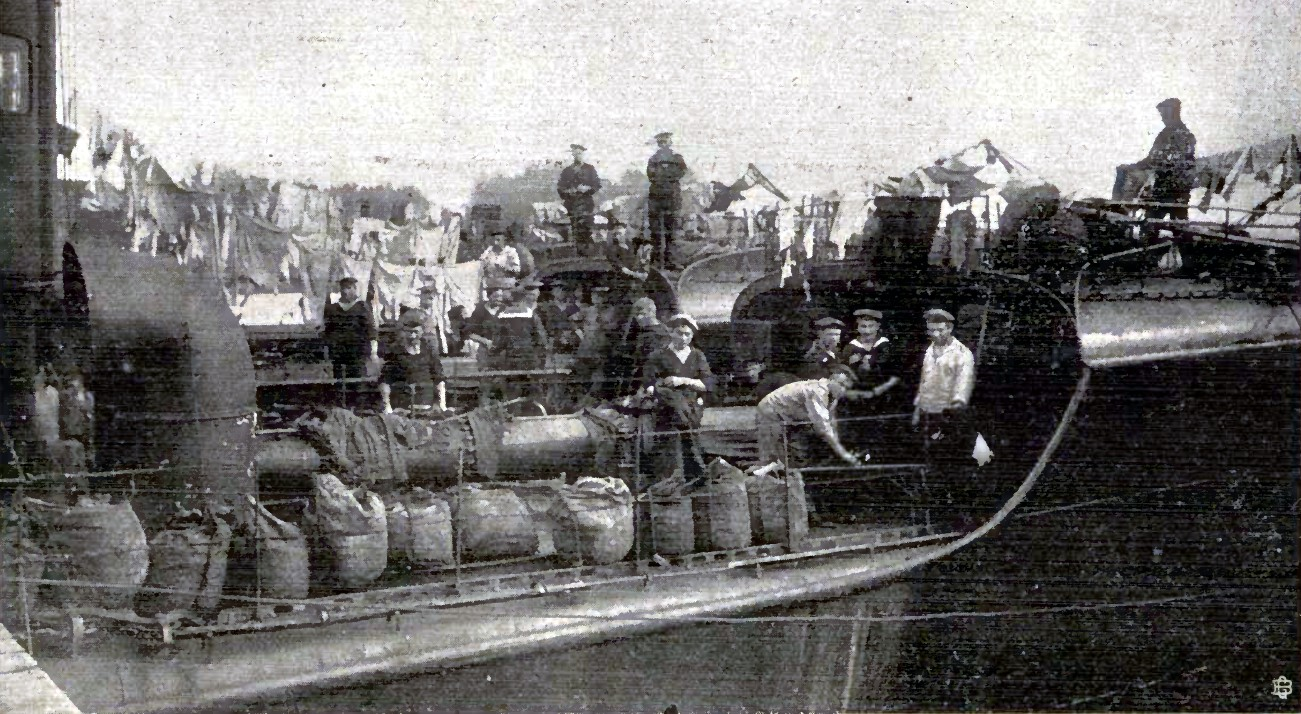
Sailors loading bags of coal aboard one of the S138-class boats

The S138-class boats had a variety of different propulsion systems. The first group of boats, from S138 to V160, were propelled by a pair of vertical, 3-cylinder triple expansion steam engines that drove a pair of three-bladed screw propellers. Steam was provided by three coal-fired water-tube boilers. The rest of the members of the class received direct steam turbines of various manufacturers, including AEG, Schichau-Werke, Zoelly, Germaniawerft, and Parsons. All of the boats used the same two-shaft arrangement as the other members of the class, with the exception of the boats G169 through G172, which were equipped with six Parsons turbines driving three shafts. Steam for both the reciprocating and turbine engines was provided by four water-tube boilers; the boats from S138 through V161 had four coal-fired models, while the remainder of the class had three such boilers and one oil-fired version.

The reciprocating engine-powered boats were rated at 30 knots (56 km/h; 35 mph) from 10,800 to 10,800 indicated horsepower (10,900 to 11,000 PS). The two-shaft turbine boats were rated at 14,600 to 17,300 shaft horsepower (14,800 to 17,500 PS) and 32 knots (59 km/h; 37 mph), while the three-shaft vessels were designed to reach 15,000 shp (15,000 PS) and 32 knots, respectively. The boats had storage capacity for 116 to 194 t (114 to 191 long tons; 128 to 214 short tons) of coal and, for those boats with oil-fired boilers, 60 to 181 t (59 to 178 long tons; 66 to 200 short tons) of fuel oil. As a result, cruising radius varied significantly, from 920 to 3,500 nautical miles (1,700 to 6,480 km; 1,060 to 4,030 mi) at 17 knots (31 km/h; 20 mph). Each vessel was equipped with two 17 kilowatts (23 hp) 110-Volt generators for electrical power. Steering was controlled with a pair of rudders, one at the stern and the other in the bow, the latter being retractable.

=== Armament ===
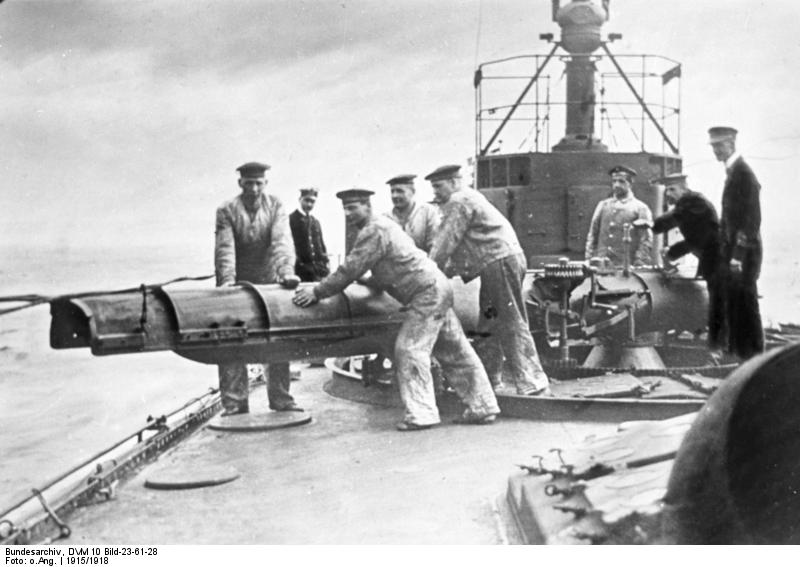
Crew operating a deck-mounted torpedo tube aboard a German torpedo boat

The armament for the members of the S138 class changed as more vessels were built. The first eleven vessels, from S138 to S149 were equipped with one 8.8 cm (3.5 in) SK L/35 gun and three 5.2 cm (2 in) SK L/55 guns in single gun mounts. They carried one hundred 8.8 cm shells and four hundred and fifty 5.2 cm rounds. The boats from V150 to V155 only carried two 8.8 cm SK L/35 guns with two hundred rounds. The remainder of the class carried two 8.8 cm SK L/30 guns, also with two hundred shells. Both versions of the 8.8 cm gun fired a shell weighing 7 kg (15.4 lb); the shorter-barreled L/30 gun had a muzzle velocity of 670 meters per second (2,198 ft/s), while the L/35 version had a velocity of 770 m/s (2,526 ft/s). The L/30 gun could be elevated to 20 degrees, for a maximum range of 7,300 m (8,000 yd), while the L/35 gun could be elevated to 25 degrees, for a maximum range of 9,090 m (9,940 yd). The 5.2 cm guns fired a 2 kg (3.86 lb) shell at a muzzle velocity of 850 m/s (2,789 ft/s). The guns could elevate up to 20 degrees, at a maximum range of 7,100 m (7,770 yd).

Throughout their careers, the boats had their armament modified. All of the first eleven vessels had their two of their 5.2 cm guns replaced with a second 8.8 cm SK L/35 gun, with the exception of S142 and S144 had all three of their 5.2 cm guns removed. S146, S153, S155, S165, S168, G170, G172 through G175, S178, S179, V180 through V186, V189, V190, and G192 through G197 had their 8.8 cm guns replaced with newer 8.8 cm SK L/45 guns; these guns fired a 10.0 kg (22 lb) shells at a muzzle velocity of 650 m/s (2,133 ft/s). At an elevation of 25 degrees, they could engage targets out to 9,600 m (10,500 yd). After World War I, many of the surviving vessels that still carried their older 8.8 cm guns had them replaced with the SK L/45 versions, and T185, T190, and T196 received two 10.5 cm (4.1 in) SK L/45 guns.

All members of the class carried three torpedo tubes as their primary offensive armament; the first half of the class's tubes were 45.0 cm (17.7 in) in diameter, and they carried four torpedoes. From G174 onward, they were equipped with 50.0 cm (19.7 in) tubes with five torpedoes. All of these tubes were in single, deck-mounted launchers. In their postwar refit, T185, T190, and T196 had their original tubes replaced with four 50 cm tubes in double, deck-mounted launchers.

== Ships ==
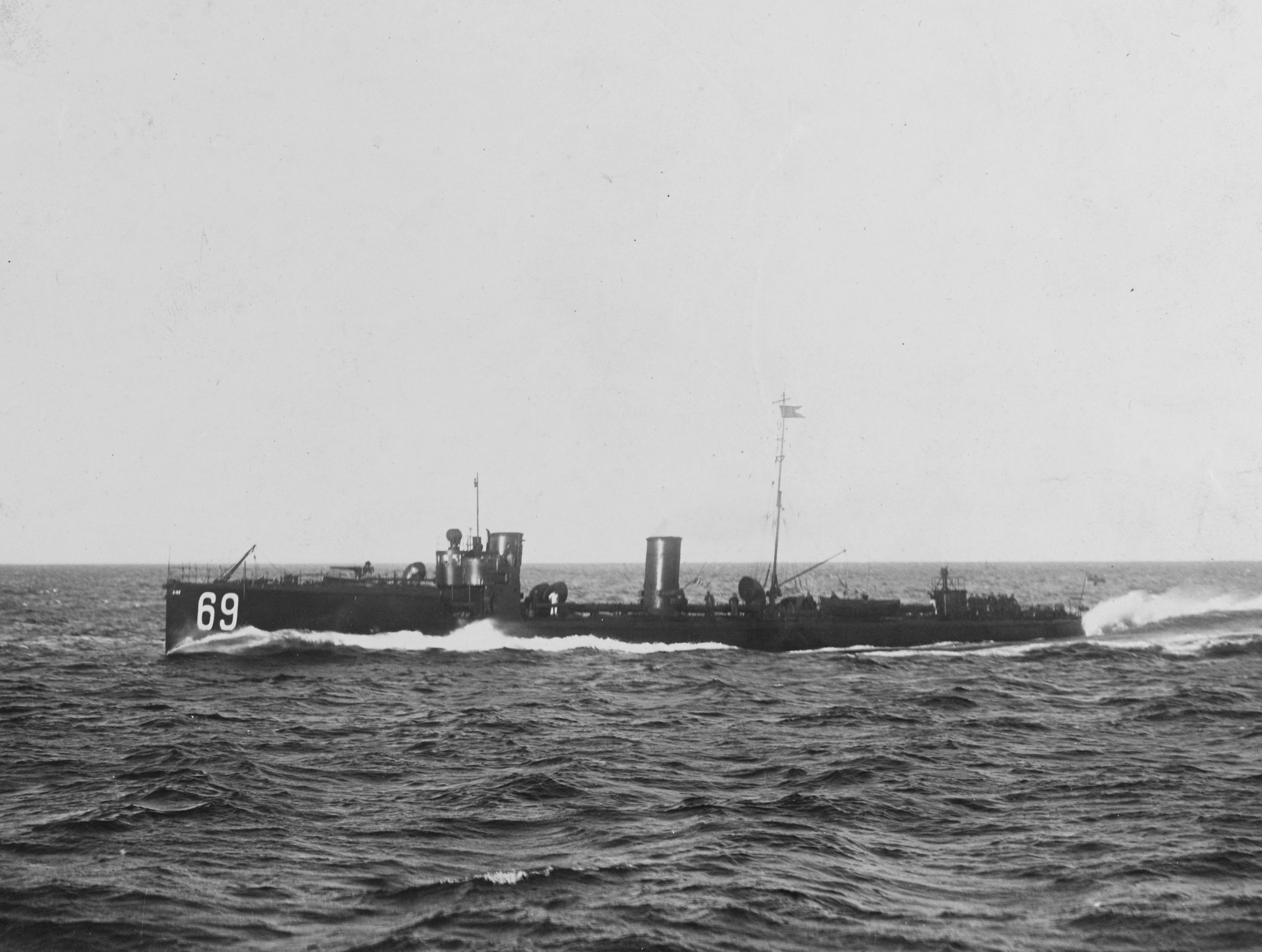
S169 underway before World War I

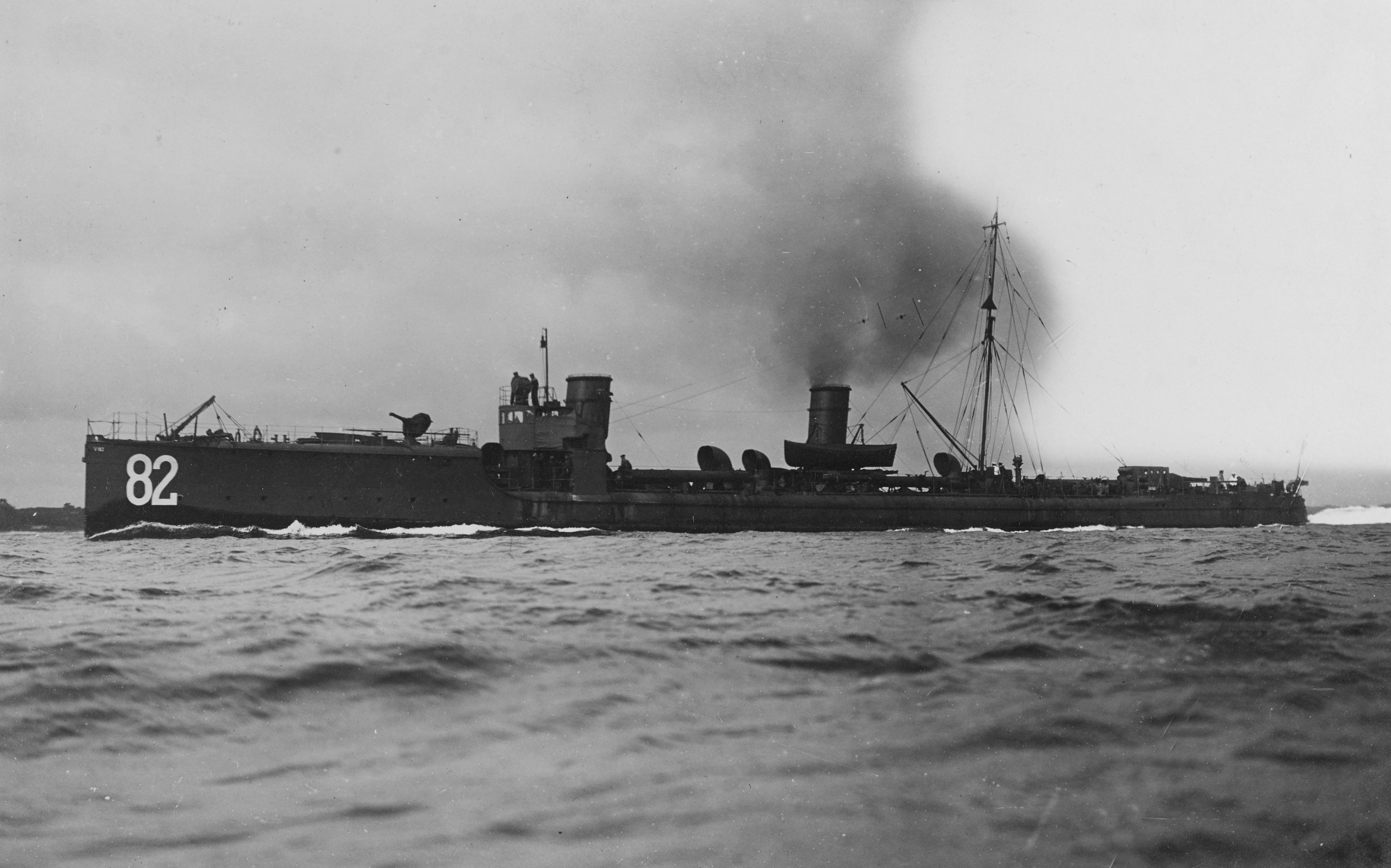
V182 during peacetime

Boat	Program	Launched	Commissioned	Fate
S138	1906	22 September 1906	7 May 1907	Mined and sunk, 7 July 1918
S139	1906	12 November 1906	6 July 1907	Unknown
S140	1906	22 December 1906	3 August 1907	
S141	1906	7 February 1907	9 September 1907	Scrapped, 1933
S142	1906	6 March 1907	20 September 1907	
S143	1906	6 April 1907	12 October 1907	Scrapped, 1930
S144	1906	27 April 1907	3 December 1907	Scrapped, 1929
S145	1906	8 June 1907	17 December 1907	
S146	1906	27 June 1907	20 November 1907	Scrapped, 1929
S147	1906	3 August 1907	10 April 1908	Scrapped, 1921
S148	1906	11 September 1907	8 March 1908	Scrapped, 1935
S149	1906	19 October 1907	27 July 1908	Scrapped, 1927
V150	1907	1 August 1907	20 November 1907	Sunk, 18 May 1915
V151	1907	14 September 1907	29 February 1908	Scrapped, 1948
V152	1907	11 October 1907	10 April 1908	Scrapped, 1935
V153	1907	13 November 1907	9 May 1908	Scrapped, 1949
V154	1907	19 December 1907	5 June 1908	Scrapped, 1935
V155	1907	28 January 1908	25 June 1908	Scuttled, 22 April 1945
V156	1907	29 February 1908	21 July 1908	Scuttled, 3 May 1945
V157	1907	29 May 1908	27 August 1908	Mined and sunk, 22 October 1943
V158	1907	23 June 1908	8 October 1908	Scrapped, 1950
V159	1907	18 July 1908	2 November 1908	Scrapped, 1922
V160	1907	12 September 1908	15 December 1908	Scrapped, 1922
V161	1907	21 April 1908	17 September 1908	Scrapped, 1922
V162	1908	9 May 1909	28 May 1909	Mined and sunk, 15 August 1916
V163	1908	2 May 1909	22 July 1909	Scrapped, 1921
V164	1908	27 May 1909	20 August 1909	Scrapped, 1922
SMS S165(i)	1908	20 March 1909	Sold to Ottoman Empire during construction, commissioned as Muavenet-i Milliye	Scrapped, 1921
SMS S166(i)	1908	24 April 1909	Sold to Ottoman Empire during construction, commissioned as Yadigar-i Millet	Sunk, 10 July 1917
SMS S167(i)	1908	3 July 1909	Sold to Ottoman Empire during construction, commissioned as Nümune-i Hamiyet	Scrapped, 1921
SMS S168(i)	1908	30 September 1909	Sold to Ottoman Empire during construction, commissioned as Gayret-i Vataniye	Wrecked, 30 October 1916
S165 (ii)	1908 replacement ship	26 November 1910	27 April 1911	Scrapped, 1922
S166 (ii)	1908 replacement ship	27 December 1910	7 July 1911	Scrapped, 1922
S167 (ii)	1908 replacement ship	15 February 1911	26 August 1911	Scrapped, 1921
S168 (ii)	1908 replacement ship	16 March 1911	1 September 1911	Scrapped, 1927
G169	1908	29 December 1908	29 April 1909	Scrapped, 1922
G170	1908	3 March 1909	14 September 1909	Scrapped, 1921
G171	1908	28 May 1909	4 January 1910	Sunk, 14 September 1912
G172	1908	10 July 1909	4 January 1910	Mined and sunk, 7 July 1918
G173	1908	28 July 1909	24 January 1910	Scrapped, 1922
G174	1909	8 January 1910	6 July 1910	Scrapped, 1922
G175	1909	24 February 1910	4 December 1910	Scrapped, 1926
S176	1909	12 April 1910	23 September 1910	Scrapped, 1922
S177	1909	21 May 1910	16 February 1911	Mined and sunk, 23 December 1915
S178	1909	14 July 1910	9 December 1910	Scrapped, 1922
S179	1909	27 August 1910	8 March 1911	Scrapped, 1921
V180	1909	15 October 1909	4 January 1910	Scrapped, 1921
V181	1909	6 November 1909	11 March 1910	Scrapped, 1922
V182	1909	1 December 1909	4 May 1910	Scrapped, 1922
V183	1909	23 December 1909	12 May 1910	Scrapped, 1922
V184	1909	26 February 1910	29 June 1910	Scrapped, 1922
V185	1909	9 April 1910	20 September 1910	Soviet prize, 1945, fate unknown
V186	1910	28 November 1910	21 April 1911	Scrapped, 1922
V187	1910	11 January 1911	4 May 1911	Sunk, 26 August 1914
V188	1910	8 February 1911	20 May 1911	Sunk, 26 July 1915
V189	1910	14 March 1911	20 June 1911	Wrecked, December 1920
V190	1910	12 April 1911	5 August 1911	Scuttled, 1946
V191	1910	2 June 1911	28 September 1911	Mined and sunk, 17 December 1915
G192	1910	5 November 1910	8 May 1911	Scrapped, 1922
G193	1910	10 December 1910	25 June 1911	Scrapped, 1922
G194	1910	12 January 1911	2 August 1911	Sunk, 26 March 1916
G195	1910	8 April 1911	8 September 1911	Scrapped, 1922
G196	1910	24 May 1911	2 October 1911	Soviet prize, 1945, scrapped thereafter
G197	1910	23 June 1911	10 November 1911	Scrapped, 1921

== Service history ==
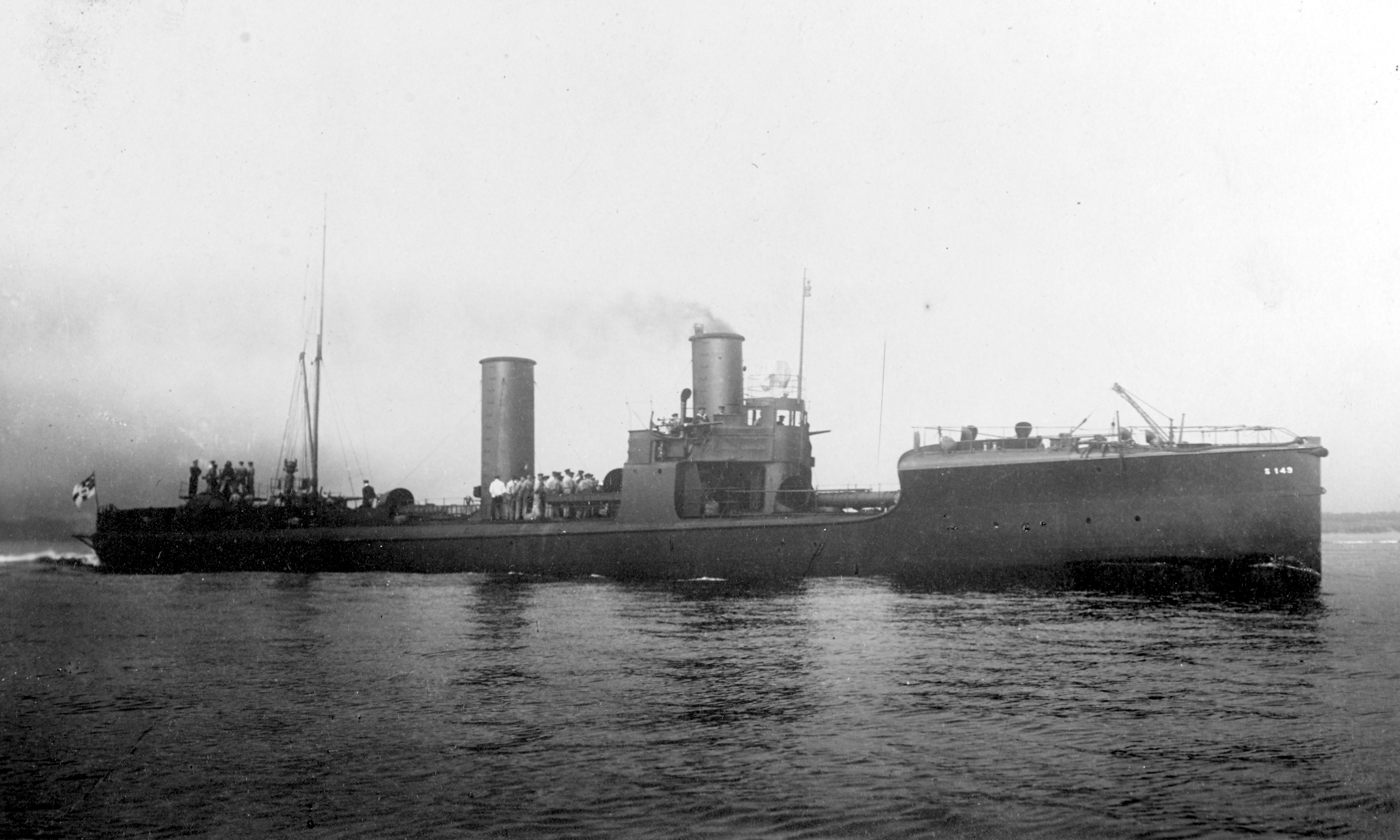
S149 in Kiel, c. 1908

Several members of the S138 class were lost during World War I in the North and Baltic Seas. V187 was sunk during the Battle of Heligoland Bight on 26 August 1914, one of the first major naval actions of the war. V150 accidentally collided with her sister ship V157 while the pair were cruising in the Jade Bight shortly after midnight on 18 May 1915. V150 sank and 60 of her crew were killed in the accident. On 26 July 1915, V188 was torpedoed and sunk by the British submarine E16 in the North Sea. On 17 December 1915, V191 and the light cruiser Bremen ran into a Russian minefield off Windau; both vessels struck mines and sank, with heavy loss of life. Nearly a third of V191's crew were killed, 25 men, along 250 out of Bremen's crew of around 300. A week later, a mine claimed S177 on 23 December, though only seven men were killed in the sinking. While on patrol in the North Sea on 26 March 1916, G194 encountered British naval forces, and the British light cruiser Cleopatra rammed and sank G194, killing 93 of her crew. V162 sank after striking a Russian mine in the Baltic on 15 August 1916; 15 of her crew were killed. Two boats struck mines and sank in the North Sea on 7 July 1918. T138 was lost shortly after 01:00 and 32 of her crew were killed, and G172 was mined and sunk a little over three hours later, killing 16 of her crew. The Muavenet-i Milliye in Ottoman service successfully torpedoed and sank the British pre-dreadnought battleship HMS Goliath on 13 May 1915 during the Dardanelles campaign, killing 570 of her crew.

In 1917 and 1918, the members of the class were all renamed to replace the builder prefix with a standardized "T" prefix. Following Germany's defeat, many of the members of the S138 class were scrapped, either after having been seized as war prizes by the victorious Allied powers or by Germany to comply with the naval disarmament clauses of the Treaty of Versailles, which permitted Germany to retain only a small fleet that included just twelve destroyers and twelve torpedo boats. (Note: Treaty of Versailles Section II: Naval Clauses, Article 181.) The older S138-class boats constituted the bulk of those vessels that Germany was permitted to retain, while the more modern, turbine-powered boats were seized. Britain received the bulk of the class members, taking control of T159, T160, T161, T163, T164, T165, T166, T169, T173, T174, T176, T178, T179, T182, T183, T184, T186, T189, T192, T193, T195, and T197. T180 became a Brazilian war prize in 1920, and Japan received T181. All of the boats were scrapped in the early 1920s, with the exception of T189, which ran aground off the English coast in December 1920. Among those stricken by the postwar Reichsmarine to comply with the Versailles Treaty were T142, T147, T167, T168, T170; these boats were also scrapped in the early 1920s.

The boats that continued on in service with the German fleet were T139, T141, T143, T144, T146, T148, T149, T151, T152, T153, T154, T155, T156, T157, T158, T168, T175, T185, T190 and T196. These boats served in a variety of roles in the 1920s and 1930s. Several of them were renamed and converted for training duties: T139 became Pfeil, T141 became the radio control ship Blitz, T153 became the range-finding training ship Eduard Jungmann. V151 was converted into a fast tugboat and she received the name Comet. T144, T149, T168, and T175 remained in active service and were scrapped in 1926–1927. Blitz, T143, T148, T152, T154 joined them at the breaker's yards between 1930 and 1935. Others, including T156 and T158, continued to serve with the fleet through the 1930s, while T196 became the flagship for the Minesweeper Command in 1938. In 1932, T185 was renamed Blitz and converted into a radio control ship to replace her sistership in that role. T190 was renamed Claus von Bevern in 1938 and was used in experiments.

By the outbreak of World War II in September 1939, only a handful of the class remained in service. T157 was mined and sunk in Neufahrwasser on 22 October 1943 and T156—which had been renamed Bremse in 1944—and T155 were scuttled in the final days of the war. V185 and V196 were taken as Soviet war prizes and were renamed Vystrel and Pronzitelnyy, respectively; their ultimate fate is unknown. Claus von Bevern was seized by the United States and was scuttled in the Skagerrak in 1946. T151 and T153 also became US prizes; they were scrapped in 1948–1949. T155, Bremse, and T157 were all raised after the war and scrapped as well. T139 was still in service with the 24th U-boat Flotilla as of 1944, but records of her ultimate fate have not survived.
