= SMS V190 =

1911 V186-class large torpedo boat

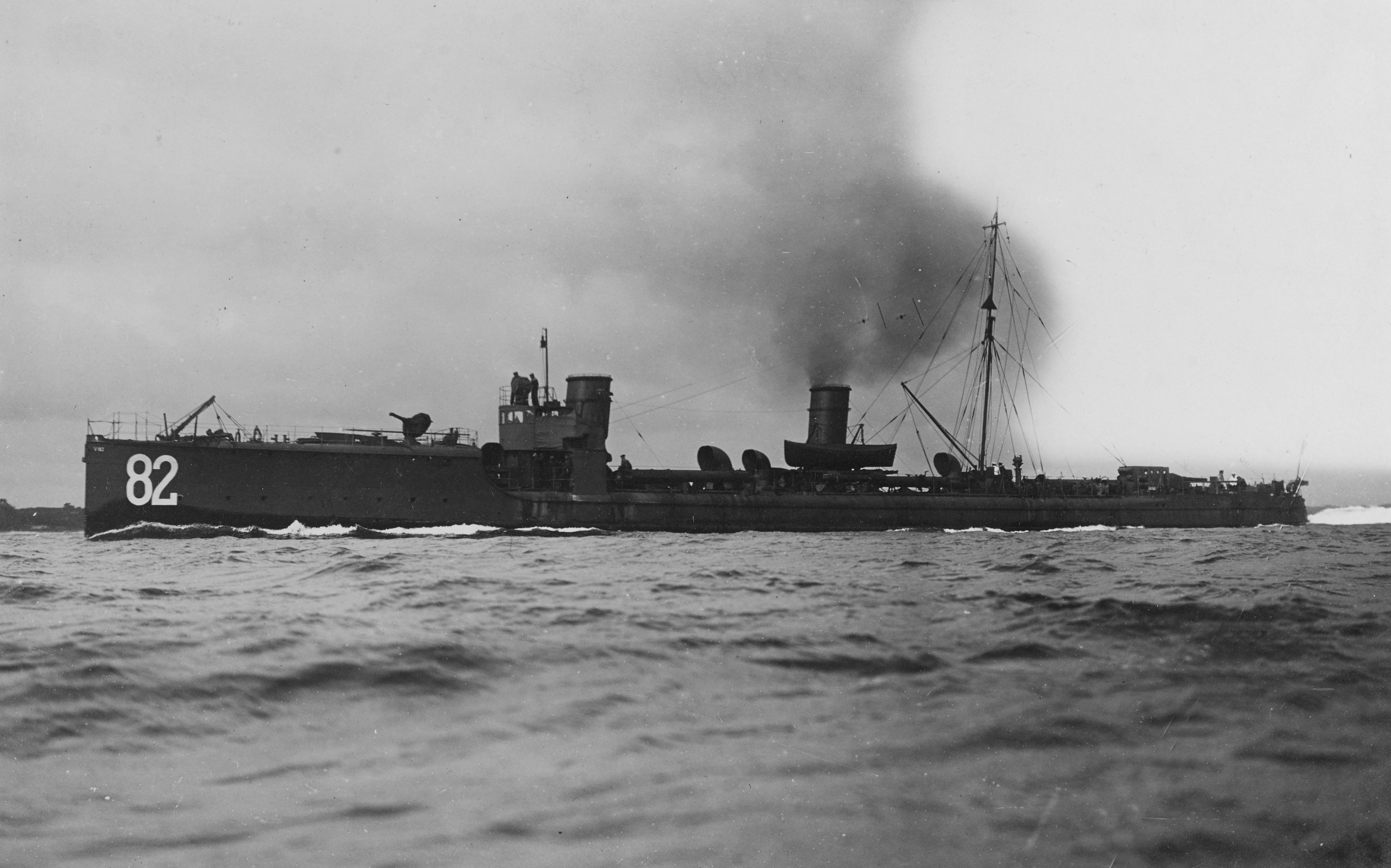
- V190's sister ship V182 underway, 1910-1914

History

Germany
- Name: SMS V190
- Builder: AG Vulcan, Stettin
- Launched: 12 April 1911
- Completed: 5 August 1911
- Renamed: 1938, Claus von Bevern
- Fate: Scuttled in 1946

General characteristics
- Class & type: S138-class torpedo boat
- Displacement: 650 t (640 long tons) design
- Length: 73.9 m (242 ft 5 in) o/a
- Beam: 7.9 m (25 ft 11 in)
- Draught: 3.1 m (10 ft 2 in)
- Installed power: 18,000 PS (18,000 shp; 13,000 kW)
- Propulsion: 3 × boilers; 2 × steam turbines
- Speed: 32 kn (37 mph; 59 km/h)
- Complement: 84
- Armament: 2× 8.8 cm guns; 4× 50 cm torpedo tubes

SMS V190 (Note: "SMS" stands for "Seiner Majestät Schiff" (transl. His Majesty's Ship)) (Note: The "V" in V190 denoted the shipbuilder who constructed her, in this case AG Vulcan.) was a S-138-class large torpedo boat of the Imperial German Navy. She was built by the AG Vulcan shipyard at Stettin between 1910 and 1911, completing on 5 August 1911.

She served throughout the First World War, taking part in the Battle of Heligoland Bight on 28 August 1914. She was renamed T190 in February 1918. Post war, T190 served in the Weimar Republic's Reichsmarine, classed as a destroyer due to the Treaty of Versailles. She was rebuilt and modernised in 1923. She was renamed Claus von Bevern in 1938, serving as a research ship. The ship was still in service on the outbreak of the Second World War, taking part in the German Invasion of Denmark in 1940. At the end of the war, Claus von Bevern was captured by the United States. She was scuttled in 1946.

== Construction and design ==
The Imperial German Navy ordered 12 large torpedo boats (Große Torpedoboote) as part of the fiscal year 1910 shipbuilding programme, with one half-flotilla of six ships (V186–V191) ordered from AG Vulcan and the other six ships from Germaniawerft. The two groups of torpedo boats were of basically similar layout but differed slightly in detailed design, with a gradual evolution of design and increase in displacement with each year's orders.

V190 was 73.9 metres (242 ft 5 in) long overall and 73.6 metres (241 ft 6 in) between perpendiculars, with a beam of 7.9 metres (25 ft 11 in) and a draught of 3.1 metres (10 ft 2 in). The ship displaced 666 tonnes (655 long tons) design and 775 tonnes (763 long tons) deep load.

Three coal-fired and one oil-fired water-tube boiler fed steam at a pressure of 18.5 standard atmospheres (272 psi) to two sets of direct-drive steam turbines. The ship's machinery was rated at 18,000 PS (18,000 shp; 13,000 kW) giving a design speed of 32 knots (37 mph; 59 km/h), with members of the class reaching a speed of 33.5 knots (38.6 mph; 62.0 km/h) during sea trials. 136 tons of coal and 67 tons of oil fuel were carried, giving an endurance of 2,360 nautical miles (2,720 mi; 4,370 km) at 12 knots (14 mph; 22 km/h), 1,250 nautical miles (1,440 mi; 2,320 km) at 17 knots (20 mph; 31 km/h) or 480 nautical miles (550 mi; 890 km) at 30 knots (35 mph; 56 km/h).

The ship was armed with two 8.8 cm L/45 guns, (Note: Both Conway's All The World's Fighting Ships and Jane's Fighting Ships claim L/30 guns were fitted.) one on the forecastle and one aft. Four single 50 cm (19.7 in) torpedo tubes were fitted, with two on the ship's beam in the gap between the forecastle and the ship's bridge which were capable of firing straight ahead, one between the ship's two funnels, and one aft of the funnels. The ship had a crew of 84 officers and men.

V190 was laid down at AG Vulcan's Stettin shipyard as Yard number 308 and was launched on 12 April 1911 and completed on 5 August 1911.

=== Modifications ===
The ship was modified in 1923, and again in 1927–28. The ship's boilers were replaced by three oil-fired boilers, with 198t of oil carried, giving a range of 1,400 nautical miles (1,600 mi; 2,600 km) at 17 knots (20 mph; 31 km/h). Two 10.5 cm L/45 guns replaced the 8.8 cm guns, while the torpedo armament remained four 50 cm tubes, but arranged in two twin mounts. When serving as a research ship, one of the 10.5 cm guns was removed, as was at least one set of torpedo tubes, with two 20mm anti-aircraft guns added.

== Service ==
On 28 August 1914, the British Harwich Force, supported by light cruisers and battlecruisers of the Grand Fleet, carried out a raid towards Heligoland with the intention of destroying patrolling German torpedo boats. The German defensive patrols around Heligoland consisted of one flotilla (I Torpedo Flotilla) of 12 modern torpedo boats forming an outer patrol line about 25 nautical miles (29 mi; 46 km) North and West of Heligoland, with an inner line of older torpedo boats of the 3rd Minesweeping Division at about 12 nautical miles (14 mi; 22 km). Four German light cruisers and another flotilla of torpedo boats (V Torpedo Boat Flotilla) was in the vicinity of Heligoland. V190 , a member of the 2nd Half Flotilla of I Torpedo Boat Flotilla, formed part of the outer screen of torpedo boats. At about 06:00 on 28 August, G194, another member of the outer screen reported spotting the periscope of a submarine. As a result, the 5th Torpedo Boat Flotilla was ordered out to hunt the hostile submarine. At 07:57 G194 was fired on by British warships, and was soon retreating towards Heligoland, pursued by four British destroyers. V Flotilla and the old torpedo boats of the 3rd Minesweeping Division also came under British fire, and were only saved by the intervention of the German cruisers Stettin and Frauenlob, with the torpedo boats V1, D8 and T33 damaged. V190 managed to successfully avoid the British ships and returned to base However, sister ship V187, leader of I Flotilla, ran into the midst of the Harwich force when trying to return to Heligoland and was sunk. The intervention of the supporting British forces resulted in the sinking of the German cruisers Mainz, Cöln and Ariadne. The British light cruiser Arethusa and destroyers Laurel, Laertes and Liberty were badly damaged but safely returned to base.

V190, part of VII Flotilla, was part of High Seas Fleet when it sailed to cover the Lowestoft Raid on 24–25 April 1916. The ship was still part of I Flotilla on 19 August 1916, when the High Seas Fleet sailed to cover a sortie of the battlecruisers of the 1st Scouting Group, but was absent at the Battle of Jutland on 31 May–1 June 1916. (Note: Campbell notes that seven older torpedo boats of I Flotilla were absent at Jutland - presumably this includes V190.)

On 22 February 1918, V190 was renamed T190, in order to free her number for new construction, in this case the destroyer H190 which was ordered from Howaldswerke, but was cancelled at the end of the war. At the end of the war T190 was a member of the 15th Half-flotilla of the 8th Torpedo Boat Flotilla.

=== Between the wars ===
After the end of the First World War, the scuttling of the German High Seas Fleet at Scapa Flow on 21 June 1919 and the Treaty of Versailles left Germany with a small navy of obsolete warships, the Reichsmarine. The Versailles treaty limited the German Navy's torpedo forces to 16 destroyers and 16 torpedo boats, with only twelve of each in active service, with replacement of the existing ships not allowed until 15 years after they were launched. Replacements could not exceed 800 t displacement for destroyers and 200 t for torpedo boats. T190 was one of the ships retained, and was classed as a destroyer for treaty purposes, although like the other ships retained as "destroyers", was always treated as a torpedo boat by the Reichsmarine.

T190 was listed as being in reserve in 1922. She was refitted and modernised in 1922. In July 1926 T190 accompanied the battleship Hessen on a visit to Neufahrwasser; they were the first German warships to visit the Free City of Danzig since Germany lost control of the city to Poland after the war. She was refitted again in 1927–28, but by the 1930s these old torpedo boats were obsolete and were either scrapped or transferred to subsidiary roles. T190 became a research ship, and was renamed Claus von Bevern in 1938.

=== Second World War ===
Claus von Bevern remained in use during the Second World War, and during the German invasion of Denmark in April 1940, returned briefly to operational service, taking part in landing operations at Nyborg and Korsør alongside the battleship Schleswig-Holstein as part of Warship Group Seven. At the end of the war, Claus von Bevern was captured by Allied forces and allocated to the United States. She was scuttled in the Skagerrak in 1946. (Note: While some sources, claim that Claus von Bevern was laden with chemical weapons when scuttled, other sources state that there is no evidence that any German warships scuttled in the Skaggerak after the end of the war were part of the chemical weapons disposal programme, with the scuttlings instead being to meet a deadline for disposal of ships incapable of repair.)

== Bibliography ==
- Campbell, John (1998). Jutland: An Analysis of the Fighting. London: Conway Maritime Press. ISBN 0-85177-750-3.
- Dodson, Aidan (2019). "Beyond the Kaiser: The IGN's Destroyers and Torpedo Boats After 1918". In Jordan, John (ed.). Warship 2019. Oxford, UK: Osprey Publishing. pp. 129–144. ISBN 978-1-4728-3595-6.
- Chesneau, Roger; Kolesnik, Eugene M., eds. (1979). Conway's All The World's Fighting Ships 1860–1905. London: Conway Maritime Press. ISBN 0-85177-133-5.
- Fock, Harald (1989). Z-Vor! Internationale Entwicklung und Kriegseinsätze von Zerstörern und Torpedobooten 1914 bis 1939 (in German). Herford, Germany: Koehlers Verlagsgesellschaft mBH. ISBN 3-7822-0207-4.
- Gardiner, Robert; Chesneau, Robert, eds. (1980). Conway's All The World's Fighting Ships 1922–1946. London: Conway Maritime Press. ISBN 0-85177-146-7.
- Gardiner, Robert; Gray, Randal, eds. (1985). Conway's All The World's Fighting Ships 1906–1921. London: Conway Maritime Press. ISBN 0-85177-245-5.
- Gröner, Erich; Jung, Dieter; Maass, Martin (1983). Die deutschen Kriegsschiffe 1815–1945: Band 2: Torpedoboote, Zerstörer, Schnellboote, Minensuchboote, Minenräumboote (in German). Koblenz: Bernard & Graef Verlag. ISBN 3-7637-4801-6.
- Hildebrand, Hans H.; Röhr, Albert; Steinmetz, Hans-Otto (1993). Die Deutschen Kriegsschiffe (Band 4) [The German Warships (Volume 4)]. Ratingen: Mundus Verlag. ASIN B003VHSRKE.
- Koop, Gerhard; Schmolke, Klaus-Peter (2014). German Destroyers of World War II. Barnsley, UK: Seaforth Publishing. ISBN 978-1-84832-193-9.
- Lenton, H. T. (1975). German Warships of the Second World War. London: Macdonald and Jane's. ISBN 0-356-04661-3.
- Massie, Robert K. (2007). Castles of Steel: Britain, Germany and the Winning of the Great War at Sea. London: Vintage Books. ISBN 978-0-099-52378-9.
- Moore, John (1990). Jane's Fighting Ships of World War I. London: Studio. ISBN 1-85170-378-0.
- Monograph No. 11: The Battle of the Heligoland Bight, August 28th, 1914 (PDF). Naval Staff Monographs (Historical). Vol. III. Naval Staff, Training and Staff Duties Division. 1921. pp. 108–166.
- Monograph No. 32: Lowestoft Raid: 24th–25th April 1916 (PDF). Naval Staff Monographs (Historical). Vol. XVI. Naval Staff, Training and Staff Duties Division. 1927.
- Monograph No. 33: Home Waters: Part VII: From June 1916 to November 1916 (PDF). Naval Staff Monographs (Historical). Vol. XVII. Naval Staff, Training and Staff Duties Division. 1927.
- Parkes, Oscar, ed. (1973) [First published 1931 by Sampson Low, Marston]. Jane's Fighting Ships 1931. David & Charles (Publishers) Limited. ISBN 0-7153-5849-9.
- Rohwer, Jürgen; Hümmelchen, Gerhard (1992). Chronology of the War at Sea 1939–1945. London: Greenhill Books. ISBN 1-85367-117-7.
