= SMS G174 =

History

Germany
- Name: G174 until 22 February 1918; T174 from 22 February 1918
- Builder: Germaniawerft, Kiel
- Launched: 8 January 1910
- Completed: 6 July 1910
- Fate: Scrapped 1922

General characteristics
- Class & type: S138-class torpedo boat
- Displacement: 650 t (640 long tons) design
- Length: 74.0 m (242 ft 9 in) o/a
- Beam: 7.9 m (25 ft 11 in)
- Draught: 3.04–3.28 m (10 ft 0 in – 10 ft 9 in)
- Installed power: 15,000 PS (15,000 shp; 11,000 kW)
- Propulsion: 4 × boilers; 2 × steam turbines
- Speed: 32 knots (59 km/h; 37 mph)
- Complement: 84
- Armament: 2 × 8.8 cm guns; 4 × 50 cm torpedo tubes

SMS G174 (Note: "SMS" stands for "Seiner Majestät Schiff" (transl. His Majesty's Ship)) (Note: The "G" in S176 denoted the shipbuilder who constructed her, in this case Germaniawerft.) was a S138-class large torpedo boat of the Imperial German Navy. She was built by Germaniawerft at Kiel in 1909–1910, launching on 4 January 1910 and completing on 6 July that year.

G174 served throughout the First World War, operating mainly in the Baltic Sea, and took part in Operation Albion, the German invasion and occupation of the West Estonian Archipelago in 1917. She was renamed T174 on 22 February 1918. Following the end of the First World War, T174 was surrendered as a reparation under the terms of the Treaty of Versailles, and was scrapped in 1922.

== Construction and design ==
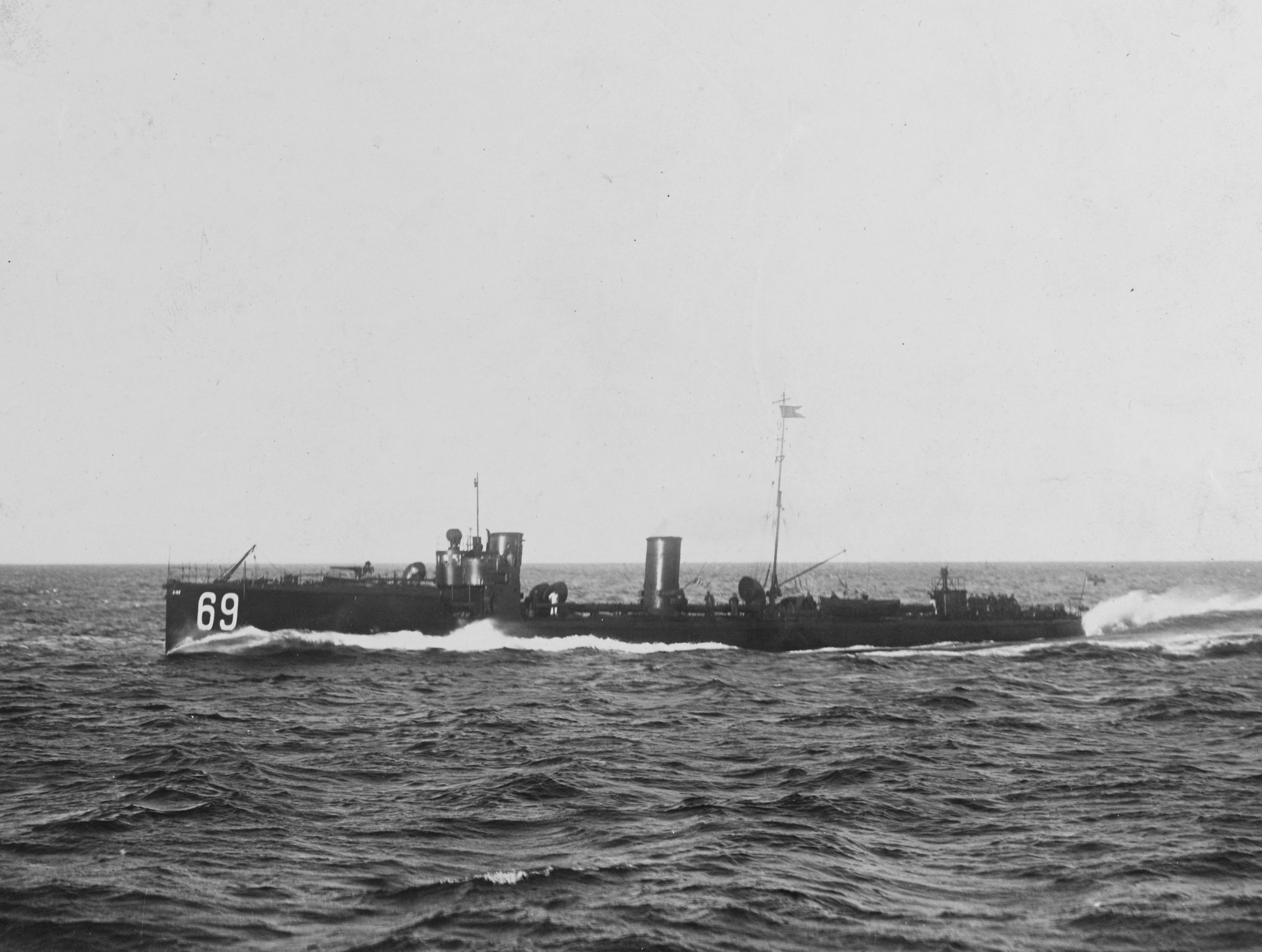
Sister ship G169

The Imperial German Navy ordered 12 large torpedo boats (Große Torpedoboote) as part of the fiscal year 1909 shipbuilding programme, with two ships (G174 and G175) ordered from Germaniawerft, four (S176–S179) from Schichau-Werke and the remaining six ships (V180–V185) from AG Vulcan. The orders were split between the three shipyards in order to manage the workload and ensure continuous employment at all three companies. The two Germania-built torpedo boats had similar hulls to those of the Germania torpedo boats built under the previous years construction programme (G169–G173), but had different machinery.

G174 was 74.0 metres (242 ft 9 in) long overall and at the waterline, with a beam of 7.9 metres (25 ft 11 in) and a draught of between 3.04 m (10 ft 0 in) forward and 3.28 m (10 ft 9 in) aft. The ship displaced 700 tonnes (690 long tons) design and 824 tonnes (811 long tons) full load. Three coal-fired and one oil-fired water-tube boilers fed steam at a pressure of 18 atm (260 psi) to two sets of Parsons direct-drive steam turbines, which drove two shafts, each with a 2.25 m (7 ft 5 in) propeller. The machinery was rated at 15,000 shp (11,000 kW), giving a design speed of 32 kn (37 mph; 59 km/h).

The ship was armed with two 8.8 cm SK L/30 guns, (Note: SK stood for Schnellfeuerkanone (quick-firing gun) or Schnellade-Kanone (fast-loading gun).) (Note: In Imperial German Navy gun nomenclature, the L/30 denotes the length of the gun. In this case, the L/30 gun is 30 caliber, meaning that the gun barrel has an overall length 30 times greater than the gun's bore.) one on the forecastle and one aft. The guns were later replaced by 8.8 cm SK L/45 guns. Four single 50 cm (19.7 in) torpedo tubes were fitted, with two on the ship's beam in the gap behind the ship's bridge and fore funnel, and two aft of the second funnel. The ship had a crew of 3 officers and 81 other ranks.

G174 was laid down at Germaniawerft's Kiel shipyard as yard number 145 and was launched on 8 January 1910. She was commissioned on 6 July 1910.

== Service ==
In May 1911, G174 was a member of the 3rd half-flotilla of the 2nd Torpedo Boat Flotilla. In 1913, she was listed as part of the 11th half-flotilla of the 6th Torpedo boat Flotilla, now in reserve.

=== First World War ===
The Imperial German Navy mobilised on 1 August 1914, owing to the imminent outbreak of the First World War. By 10 August, G174, commanded by Korvettenkapitän Adolf Pfeiffer, was the leader of the newly established 8th Torpedo Boat Flotilla, part of the High Seas Fleet. In October 1914 the 8th Torpedo Boat flotilla, including G174, was temporarily detached to the Baltic Sea as part of a large scale deployment of torpedo boats from both the High Seas Fleet and training units to counter operations of British submarines in the Baltic. The 8th Flotilla returned to the North Sea at the end of the month.

On 28–29 April 1916, G174 took part in a minelaying operation off the Finnish coast, with the cruiser Strassburg and the auxiliary minelayer Rügen laying 371 mines. The operation was disrupted when Rügen and the torpedo boat V153 collided, while on the return journey, a submarine fired a torpedo at G174 which missed its target. G174 was listed as a member of the 16th half-flotilla of the 8th Torpedo boat Flotilla in May 1916.

In October 1917, the Germans carried out Operation Albion, an amphibious assault to capture Ösel and Muhu islands off the coast of Estonia. G174 was part of the 16th half-flotilla of the 8th Torpedo Boat flotilla during these operations. On 18 November 1917, (Note: 19 November according to Gröner et al.) the steamer Newa set out from Kuressaare on Saaremaa for Liepāja on the mainland, carrying an artillery battery. While navigating a swept channel, Newa struck a mine, which blew off the ship's bow, with the remains of the ship sinking within minutes. G174 approached the scene of Newa's sinking from the north, but as she carried no boats, was unable to assist in rescue operations. While 21 men (five of whom later died) were rescued by a boat from the steamer Carbo II, which was also passing through the swept channel, and by two escort boats detached from a north-bound convoy, losses were heavy, with over 139 killed. (Note: von Gagern notes 139 killed from the artillery battery, with an unknown number of other men using the ship to go on leave on the mainland. Two of the ship's crew were reported by von Gagern as surviving, from a normal ship's crew of 14 stated by Gröner et al.)

On 22 February 1918, G174 was renamed T174 in order to free up her number for new construction, in this case the 1918 Mobilisation type V174, which was broken up on the stocks following the end of the war. The October Revolution in Russia and the subsequent Armistice between Russia and the Central Powers allowed the release of forces from the Baltic to the North Sea, and by the end of April 1918, the 8th Flotilla had returned to the High Seas Fleet, with T174 remaining part of the 16th half-flotilla. T174 was still part of the 16th half-flotilla at the end of the war.

=== Disposal ===
The Armistice of 11 November 1918 resulted in most of the High Seas Fleet being interned at Scapa Flow. T174 was initially retained by Germany, but following the Scuttling of the German fleet at Scapa Flow on 21 June 1919, the terms of Treaty of Versailles required more ships to be surrendered to compensate for the scuttled ships. These additional ships included T174 which was stricken in August 1920. The ship was sold for scrap in February–March 1921 and broken up at Granton, Edinburgh in 1922.

== Bibliography ==
- Chesneau, Roger; Kolesnik, Eugene M., eds. (1979). Conway's All The World's Fighting Ships 1860–1905. London: Conway Maritime Press. ISBN 0-85177-133-5.
- Dodson, Aidan (2019). "Beyond the Kaiser: The IGN's Destroyers and Torpedo Boats After 1918". In Jordan, John (ed.). Warship 2019. Oxford, UK: Osprey Publishing. pp. 129–144. ISBN 978-1-4728-3595-6.
- Firle, Rudolph (1921). Der Krieg in der Ostsee: Erster Band: Von Kriegsbeginn bis Mitte März 1915. Der Krieg zur See: 1914–1918 (in German). Berlin: Verlag von E. S. Mittler und Sohn.
- Fock, Harald (1981). Schwarze Gesellen: Band 2: Zerstörer bis 1914 (in German). Herford, Germany: Koelers Verlagsgesellschaft mBH. ISBN 3-7822-0206-6.
- Fock, Harald (1989). Z-Vor! Internationale Entwicklung und Kriegseinsätze von Zerstörern und Torpedobooten 1914 bis 1939 (in German). Herford, Germany: Koehlers Verlagsgesellschaft mBH. ISBN 3-7822-0207-4.
- Friedman, Norman (2011). Naval Weapons of World War One: Guns, Torpedoes, Mines and ASW Weapons of All Nations: An Illustrated Directory. Barnsley, UK: Seaforth Publishing. ISBN 978-1-84832-100-7.
- von Gagern, Ernst (1962). Der Krieg in der Ostsee: Dritter Band: Von Anfang 1916 bis zum Kriegsende (in German). Frankfurt: Verlag von E.S. Mittler & Sohn.
- Gardiner, Robert; Gray, Randal, eds. (1985). Conway's All The World's Fighting Ships 1906–1921. London: Conway Maritime Press. ISBN 0-85177-245-5.
- Gladisch, Walter, ed. (1965). Der Krieg in der Nordsee: Band 7: Vom Sommer 1917 bis zum Kriegsende 1918. Der Krieg zur See: 1914–1918. Frankfurt: Verlag E.S. Mittler & Sohn.
- Gröner, Erich; Jung, Dieter; Maass, Martin (1983). Die deutschen Kriegsschiffe 1815–1945: Band 2: Torpedoboote, Zerstörer, Schnellboote, Minensuchboote, Minenräumboote (in German). Koblenz: Bernard & Graef Verlag. ISBN 3-7637-4801-6.
- Gröner, Erich; Jung, Dieter; Maass, Martin (1990a). Die deutschen Kriegsschiffe 1815–1945: Band 7: Landungsverbände (II): Landungsfahrzeuge i. e. S (Tiel 2), Landungsfähren, Landungsunterstützungsfahtzeuge, Transporter; Schiffe und Boote des Heeres, Schiffe und Boote der Seeflieger/Luftwaffe, Kolonialfahrzuege (in German). Koblenz: Bernard & Graef Verlag. ISBN 3-7637-4807-5.
- Gröner, Erich; Jung, Dieter; Maass, Martin (1990b). German Warships 1915–1945: Volume One: Major Surface Vessels. Annapolis, Maryland, US: Naval Institute Press. ISBN 0-87021-790-9.
- Groos, O. (1920). Der Krieg in der Nordsee: Erster Band: Von Kreigsbeginn bis Anfang September 1914. Der Krieg zur See: 1914–1918 (in German). Berlin: Verlag von E. S. Mittler und Sohn – via National Library of Estonia.
- Halpern, Paul G. (1994). A Naval History of World War I. London: UCL Press. ISBN 1-85728-498-4.
- Moore, John (1990). Jane's Fighting Ships of World War I. London: Studio. ISBN 1-85170-378-0.
- Stoelzel, Albert (1930). Ehrenrangliste der Kaiserlich Deutschen Marine 1914–1918 (in German). Berlin: Thormann & Goetsch.
