= SMS S143 =

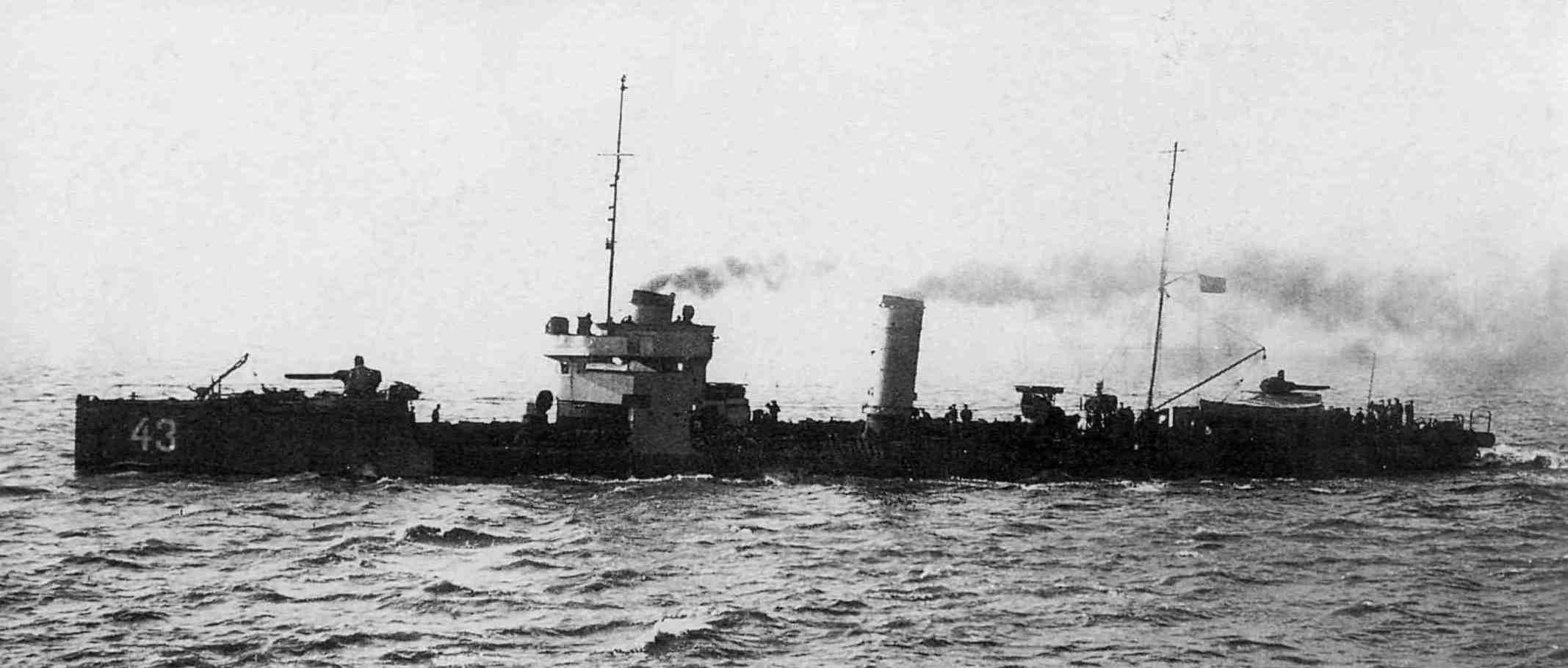
- T143

History

Germany
- Name: SMS S143
- Builder: Schichau-Werke, Elbing
- Launched: 6 April 1907
- Completed: 12 October 1907
- Renamed: T143: 24 September 1917
- Stricken: 10 May 1927
- Fate: Sold for scrap 25 March 1930

General characteristics
- Class & type: S138-class torpedo boat
- Displacement: 533 t (525 long tons) design
- Length: 70.7 m (231 ft 11 in) o/a
- Beam: 7.8 m (25 ft 7 in)
- Draught: 2.75 m (9 ft 0 in)
- Installed power: 11,000 PS (11,000 shp; 8,100 kW)
- Propulsion: 4 × coal fired water-tube boilers; 2 × triple expansion steam engines
- Speed: 30 kn (35 mph; 56 km/h)
- Complement: 80
- Armament: 1 × 8.8 cm gun; 3 × 5.2 cm gun; 3× 45 cm torpedo tubes

SMS S143 (Note: "SMS" stands for "Seiner Majestät Schiff" (transl. His Majesty's Ship)) (Note: The "S" in S143 denoted the shipbuilder who constructed her, in this case Schichau-Werke.) was a S138-class large torpedo boat of the Imperial German Navy. The S138-class were large torpedo boats that were required to reach a speed of 30 kn (35 mph; 56 km/h) and armed with three 45 cm (17.7 in) torpedo tubes. S143 was built by the Schichau-Werke at Elbing and was launched on 6 April 1907, entering service later the same year.

S143 was sunk by a boiler explosion on 4 August 1914, shortly after the start of the First World War, but was raised, repaired and returned to service. S143 served in the Baltic Sea for the rest of the war, and was renamed T143 in 1917. She took part in Operation Albion, the German invasion and occupation of the West Estonian Archipelago in October 1917, and in the German invasion of the Åland islands in 1918.

T143 continued to serve in postwar Weimar Germany's Reichsmarine, and was stricken in 1927 and scrapped in 1930.

== Design and construction ==
The Imperial German Navy ordered 12 large torpedo boats (Große Torpedoboote) from Schichau-Werke as part of the fiscal year 1906 shipbuilding programme. This 12-ship order, sufficient to equip an entire torpedo-boat flotilla, was a result of a planned increase in the size of the German torpedo forces from 96 to 144 torpedo boats under the 1906 Amendment to the 1900 Naval Act. The 1906 torpedo boats were of similar size and armament to G137, the turbine-engined torpedo boat that was the last of the 1905 programme, and were required to reach a speed of 30 kn (35 mph; 56 km/h).

S143 was 70.7 m (231 ft 11 in) long overall and 70.2 m (230 ft 4 in) between perpendiculars, with a beam of 7.8 m (25 ft 7 in) and a draught of 2.75 m (9 ft 0 in). The ship had a design displacement of 533 t (525 long tons) which increased to 684 t (673 long tons) at deep load. Four coal-fired water-tube boilers fed steam at a pressure of 19.5 atm (287 psi) to 2 three-cylinder triple expansion engines with a total of 11,000 ihp (8,200 kW). This allowed speeds of 30.3 kn (34.9 mph; 56.1 km/h) to be reached during Sea trials. The ships bunkers had a capacity of 194 t of coal, while a further 20 t could be carried on deck. This gave a range of 1,830 nmi (2,110 mi; 3,390 km) at 17 knots (20 mph; 31 km/h) and 390 nmi (450 mi; 720 km) at 24 kn (28 mph; 44 km/h).

S143's as-built armament was a single 8.8 cm (3.5 in) SL L/35 gun (with 100 shells) and three 5.2 cm (2.0 in) L/55 guns (with 150 shells per gun). Three single 45 cm (17.7 in) torpedo tubes were fitted, with a single spare torpedo carried. She was later re-armed, with a second 8.8 cm L/35 gun replacing two of the 5.2 cm guns. The ship had a crew of 3 officers and 77 other ranks, which increased to 93 when being used as a flotilla leader.

S143 was laid down at Schichau's Elbing, Prussia (now Elbląg, Poland) shipyard as yard number 782, was launched on 6 April 1907 and was completed on 12 October 1907.

== Service ==
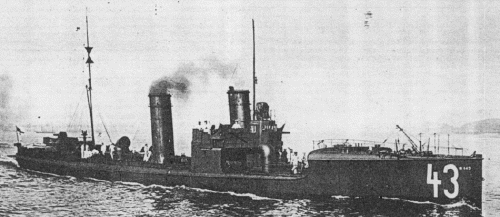
S143 in 1912

In 1908, S143 was listed as part of the 4rd torpedo boat half-flotilla, part of the Training Flotilla (Schul-Flottille). In 1909, S143 had moved to the 1st half-flotilla, part of the 1st Training Flotilla. In 1910, S143 was still part of the 1st half-flotilla which was now part of the active duty 2st Torpedo boat Flotilla, continuing to serve with the same formation into 1911. In 1913, she was listed as leader of the 3rd half flotila of the 2nd Torpedo boat Flotilla, remaining in that role in 1914.

=== First World War ===
On 4 August 1914, the same day that Britain declared war on Germany, S143 suffered a boiler explosion and sank in the western Baltic sea near Gjedser. Twenty men were killed, and S143 sank. The torpedo boat was raised, however, repaired and returned to service. On 23 October 1915, S143 and sister ship S142 were escorting the armoured cruiser Prinz Adalbert, which had set out from Libau (now Liepāja, Latvia) to carry out a patrol between Fårö and Dagerort, when the British submarine E8 torpedoed Prinz Adalbert. One of Prinz Adalbert's ammunition magazines exploded, sinking the cruiser. There were only three survivors, which were picked up by S142 and S143, with 672 killed. This was the biggest loss of life during the war for the German Navy in the Baltic. The two torpedo boats did not see any torpedo tracks, and it was believed at the time that Prinz Adalbert had been sunk by a mine.

On 2/3 May 1916, S143 took part in a minelaying operation in the Gulf of Finland, part of a minesweeping screen ahead of the minelayer Deutschland. The next day, S143 and S175 struck the submerged wrecks of sunken merchant ships at the entrance to Libau harbour, and were both damaged sufficiently to require repair at a dockyard. S143 was renamed T143 on 24 September 1917, in order to release her name for new construction, in this case V143, a 1916 Mobilisation Type torpedo boat which although launched in 1918, was never completed. T143, now part of the 7th torpedo-boat half-flotilla, took part in Operation Albion, the German invasion and occupation of the West Estonian Archipelago in October 1917. On 7 March 1918, T143 took part in German landings in the Åland islands. T143 remained part of the 7th half-flotilla, part of the 4th Torpedo Boat Flotilla, at the end of the war.

=== Weimar Republic ===
After the end of the war, T143 was retained by the Weimar Republic's navy, the Reichsmarine, and when the Treaty of Versailles limited Germany's torpedo forces to 12 destroyers and 12 torpedo boats in active service, with a further 4 of each type in reserve, T139 was retained as an active torpedo boat. (Note: While the Versailles Treaty distinguished between destroyers and torpedo boats, with the more modern vessels being declared as destroyers by Germany for treaty purposes, in actual use the Reichsmarine did not distinguish between the two, and designated all as torpedo boats.) T143 was modified with a larger bridge and funnel caps fitted while being refitted for Reichsmarine service, while the 8.8 cm guns were replaced by more powerful 8.8 cm SK L/45 naval guns. The construction of the new Type 23 and Type 24 torpedo boats allowed the older vessels to be phased out, and S143 was stricken on 10 May 1927, and sold for scrap on 25 March 1930.

== Bibliography ==
- Chesneau, Roger; Kolesnik, Eugene M., eds. (1979). Conway's All The World's Fighting Ships 1860–1905. London: Conway Maritime Press. ISBN 0-85177-133-5.
- Dodson, Aidan (2019). "Beyond the Kaiser: The IGN's Destroyers and Torpedo Boats After 1918". In Jordan, John (ed.). Warship 2019. Oxford, UK: Osprey Publishing. pp. 129–144. ISBN 978-1-4728-3595-6.
- Fock, Harald (1981). Schwarze Gesellen: Band 2: Zerstörer bis 1914 (in German). Herford, Germany: Koelers Verlagsgesellschaft mBH. ISBN 3-7822-0206-6.
- Fock, Harald (1989). Z-Vor! Internationale Entwicklung und Kriegseinsätze von Zerstörern und Torpedobooten 1914 bis 1939 (in German). Herford, Germany: Koehlers Verlagsgesellschaft mBH. ISBN 3-7822-0207-4.
- Firle, Rudolph (1921). Der Krieg in der Ostsee: Erster Band: Von Kriegsbeginn bis Mitte März 1915. Der Krieg zur See: 1914–1918 (in German). Berlin: Verlag von E. S. Mittler und Sohn.
- von Gagern, Ernst (1962). Der Krieg in der Ostsee: Dritter Band: Von Anfang 1916 bis zum Kriegsende (in German). Frankfurt: Verlag von E.S. Mittler & Sohn.
- Gardiner, Robert; Gray, Randal, eds. (1985). Conway's All The World's Fighting Ships 1906–1921. London: Conway Maritime Press. ISBN 0-85177-245-5.
- Gröner, Erich; Jung, Dieter; Maass, Martin (1983). Die deutschen Kriegsschiffe 1815–1945: Band 2: Torpedoboote, Zerstörer, Schnellboote, Minensuchboote, Minenräumboote (in German). Koblenz: Bernard & Graef Verlag. ISBN 3-7637-4801-6.
- Halpern, Paul G. (1994). A Naval History of World War I. London: UCL Press. ISBN 1-85728-498-4.
- Hildebrand, Hans H.; Röhr, Albert; Stenmetz, Hans-Otto (1982). Die Deutschen Kriegsschiffe: Biographien – ein Spiegel der Marinegeschichte von 1815 bis zur Gegenwart: Band 5 (in German). Herford, Germany: Koelers Verlagsgesellschaft mBH. ISBN 3-7822-0236-8.
- Rollmann, Heinrich (1929). Der Krieg in der Ostsee: Zwieter Band: Das Kriegjahr 1915. Der Krieg zur See: 1914–1918 (in German). Berlin: Verlag von E.S. Mittler & Sohn.
- Stoelzel, Albert (1930). Ehrenrangliste der Kaiserlich Deutschen Marine 1914–1918 (in German). Berlin: Thormann & Goetsch.
