= Torpedo-boats of the German Navy (1871–1919) =

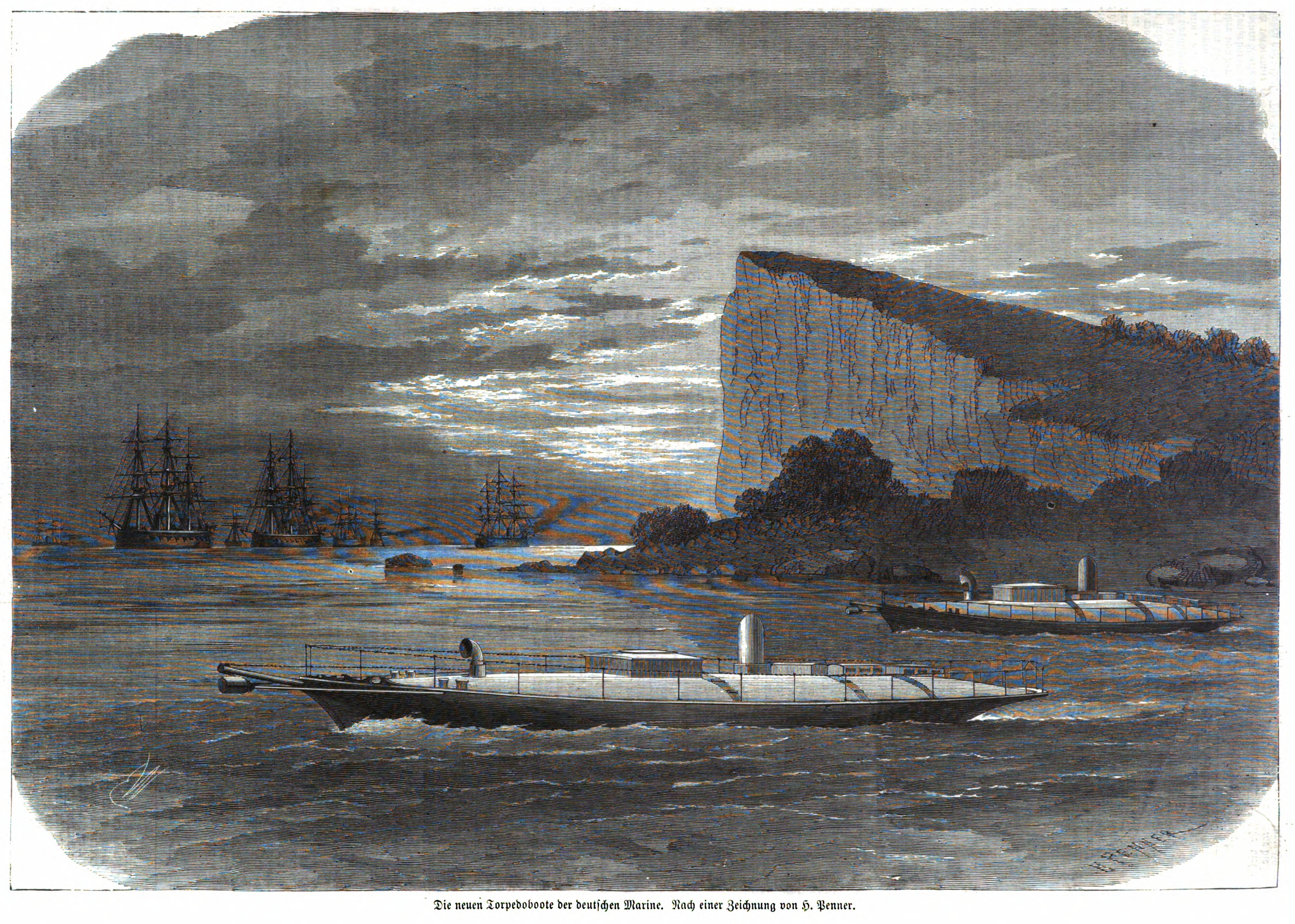
Devrient-type spar torpedo boat (1871)

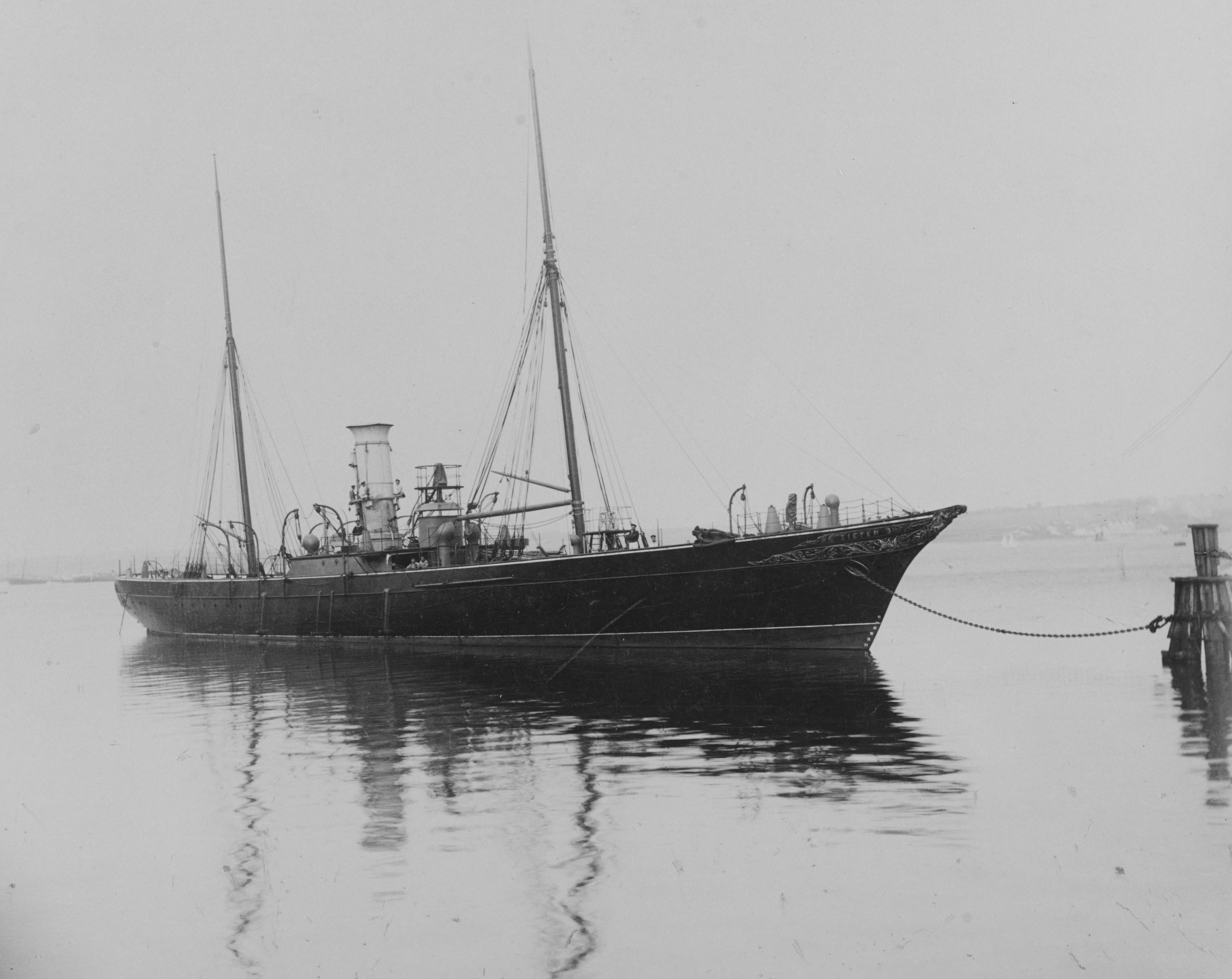
SMS Zieten, testbed for the new Whitehead torpedo

Torpedo boats had been operated by the Imperial German Navy (German: Kaiserliche Marine) from the very beginning. The "Imperial Navy" existed between 1871 and 1919. In 1870 there had been 14 tugboats and harbour vessels and 7 rowing boats, which had been armed with spar torpedoes to protect the Elbe and Weser during the Franco-Prussian War.

== Early torpedo vessels and boats ==
Vessels	Type	Launched	In Service	Comments.
Devrient; I – III	spar torpedo boat	1871	1872–1885	harbour protection boats, stricken 1885, mine layers.
Waltjen; I – III	spar torpedo boat	1871	1872–1881	harbour protection boats, stricken 1881, mine layers.
Notus, Zephir, Rival, Ulan	torpedo steamer	1873–1876	1874–1909	torpedo testing, used as tug steamers or mine layer (Minenleger 4 ex Rival).
Zieten	torpedo cruiser	1876	1876–1919	after torpedo testing aviso, coastal patrol ship in WW I, stricken 1919.
Basilisk, Jäger	torpedo canon boat	1862 & 1883	1863–1889	torpedo testing since 1874.
Schütze, Flink, Scharf, Tapfer, Kühn, Vorwärts, Sicher	torpedo boat I. class	1882	1882–1891	school boats, Tapfer: harbour protection boat and mine layers.
A 1, G 1, H 1, K 1	small torpedo boats	1884–1888	1885–1899	torpedo testing and school boats.
Th 1	small torpedo boat (Thornycroft)	1884	1884–1899	testing and harbour protection boat, scrapped 1900.
Th 2	small torpedo boat (Thornycroft)	1884	1884–?	torpedo testing, later Seebär testing gyroscopic stabilization.
Y 1	small torpedo boat (Yarrow)	1884	1885–1899	testing and harbour protection boat.
White I, White II	micro torpedo boat (White)	-	1885–1910	fate unknown.

== Small torpedo boats – pre-war types ==
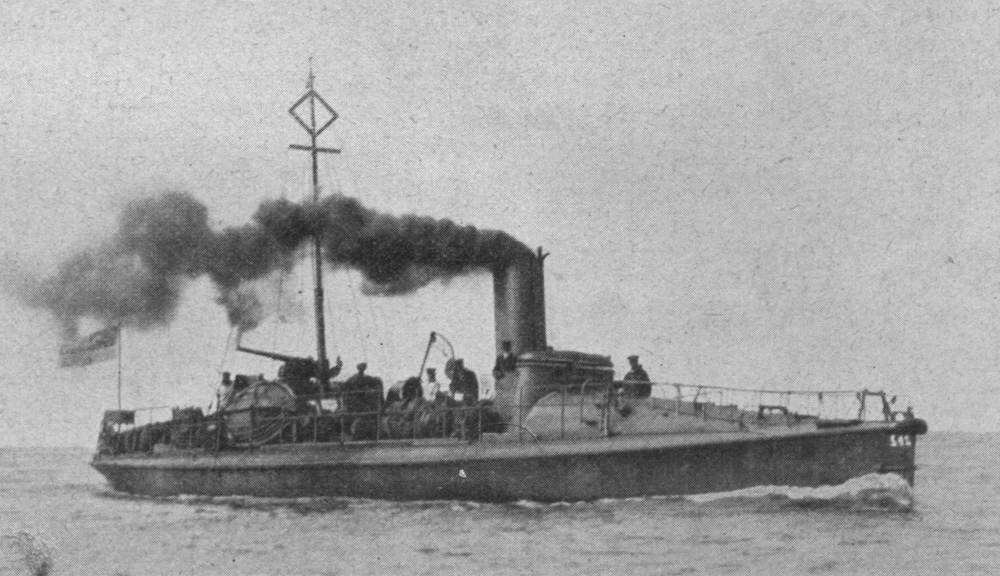
SM S 42, a S 7-class torpedo boat

6 boats built at AG Weser, Bremen; 10 boats built at AG Vulcan, Stettin; 6 boats built at Schichau, Elbing.

Vessels	Launched	In Service	Comments.
W 1 – W 6	1884	1884–1899	stricken 1899 and scrapped 1910.
V 1 – V 10	1884	1884–1899	stricken 1899 and scrapped 1910.
S 1 – S 6	1884	1884–1899	stricken 1899 and scrapped 1910.

The later USS Somers was built as a private speculation by Schichau in 1897.

== Small and coastal torpedo boats in World War I ==
=== Small torpedo boats ===
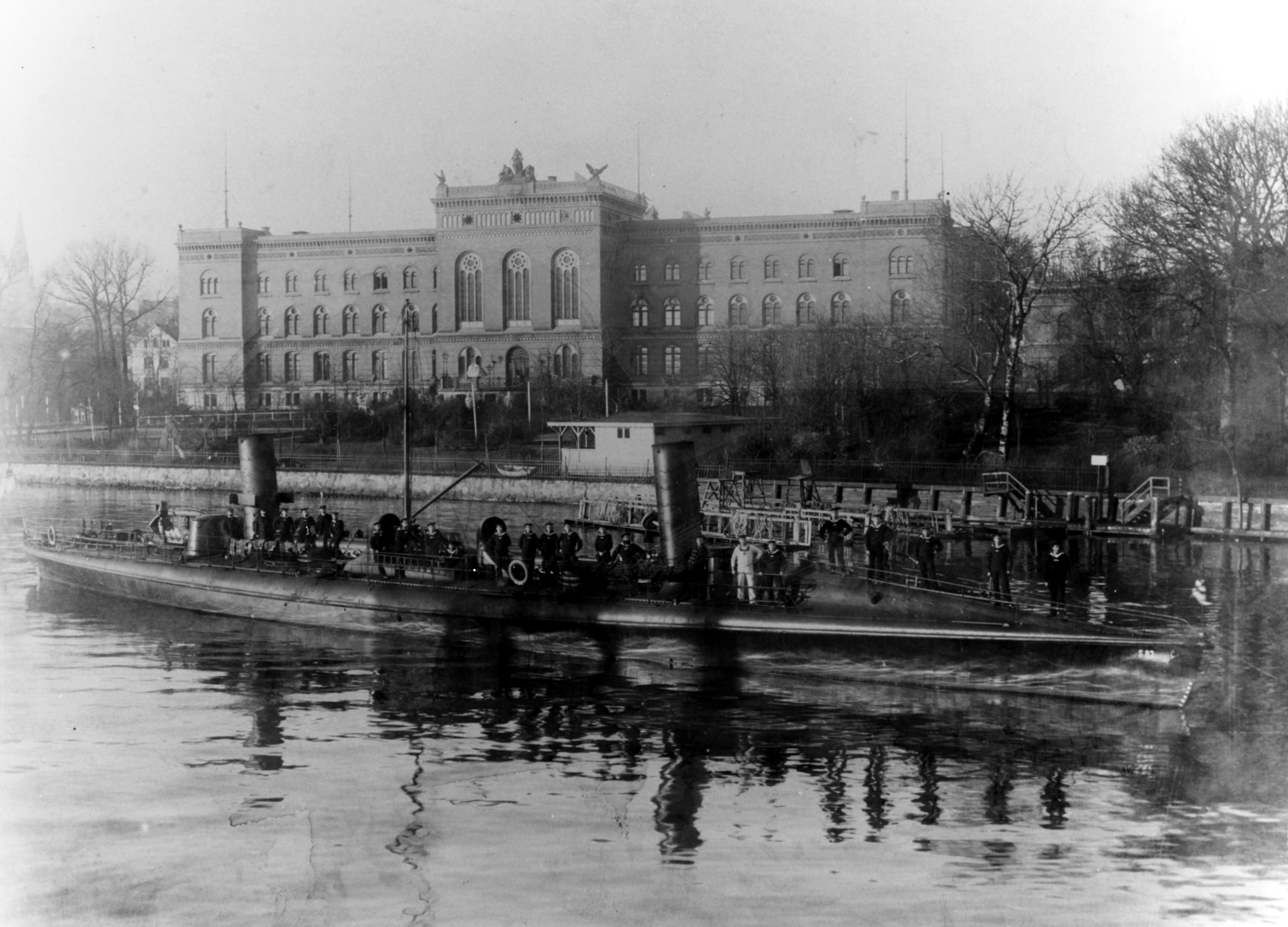
SM S 82, a S 66-class torpedo boat (1897)

60 boats of S 7-class had been built at Schichau, Elbing, 22 boats of S 66-class had been built at Schichau and the boats G 88 and G 89 had been built at Germaniawerft in Kiel.

The first boats had been stricken in 1905. The remaining boats had been renamed in 1910 and 1914 as SM T 11 – SM T 65. S12, T 21, T 25, S 26, S 32, S 41, S 48, T 50 got lost by collisions or storm. The S 66-class boats had been renamed in 1914 as SM T 66 – SM T 89.

In World War I the remaining boats had been used as mine sweepers, school boats and tenders. T 43, T 46, T 47, T 51, T 52, T 54, T 57, T 58, T 64, T 65 and T 66, T 67, T 68, T 78 had been sunk by mines.

General characteristics (S7–S65)
- Displacement: 98 t (96 long tons)
- Speed: 20.4 knots (37.8 km/h; 23.5 mph)
- Armament: 1 × 5.0 cm (2.0 in) guns; 3 × 45 cm (18 in) torpedo tube

General characteristics (S66–S87)
- Displacement: 172–186 t (169–183 long tons)
- Speed: 22–25 knots (41–46 km/h; 25–29 mph)
- Armament: 1 × 5.0 cm (2.0 in) guns; 3 × 45 cm (18 in) torpedo tube

General characteristics (G88 & G89)
- Displacement: 177 t (174 long tons)
- Speed: 26 knots (48 km/h; 30 mph)
- Armament: 1 × 5.0 cm (2.0 in) guns; 3 × 45 cm (18 in) torpedo tube

Vessels	Launched	In Service	Comments.
S 7 – S 10	1885	1885–1910	stricken 1905–1910, used for heating or scrapped 1910.
S 11 – S 16	1885	1885–1920	S 12 sunk after collision in 1908, the others stricken and scrapped 1920.
S 17 – S 19	1885	1885–1906	stricken 1905 and 1906.
S 20 – S 65	1885–1892	1885–1920	losses due to collision, storm and mines; the remaining boats had been stricken and scrapped 1920.
S 66 – S 87	1893–1897	1893–1921	4 sunk by mines, the others stricken 1920 and 1921, scrapped 1921.
G 88, G 89	1897–1898	1898–1921	stricken 1921.

=== Coastal torpedo boats ===
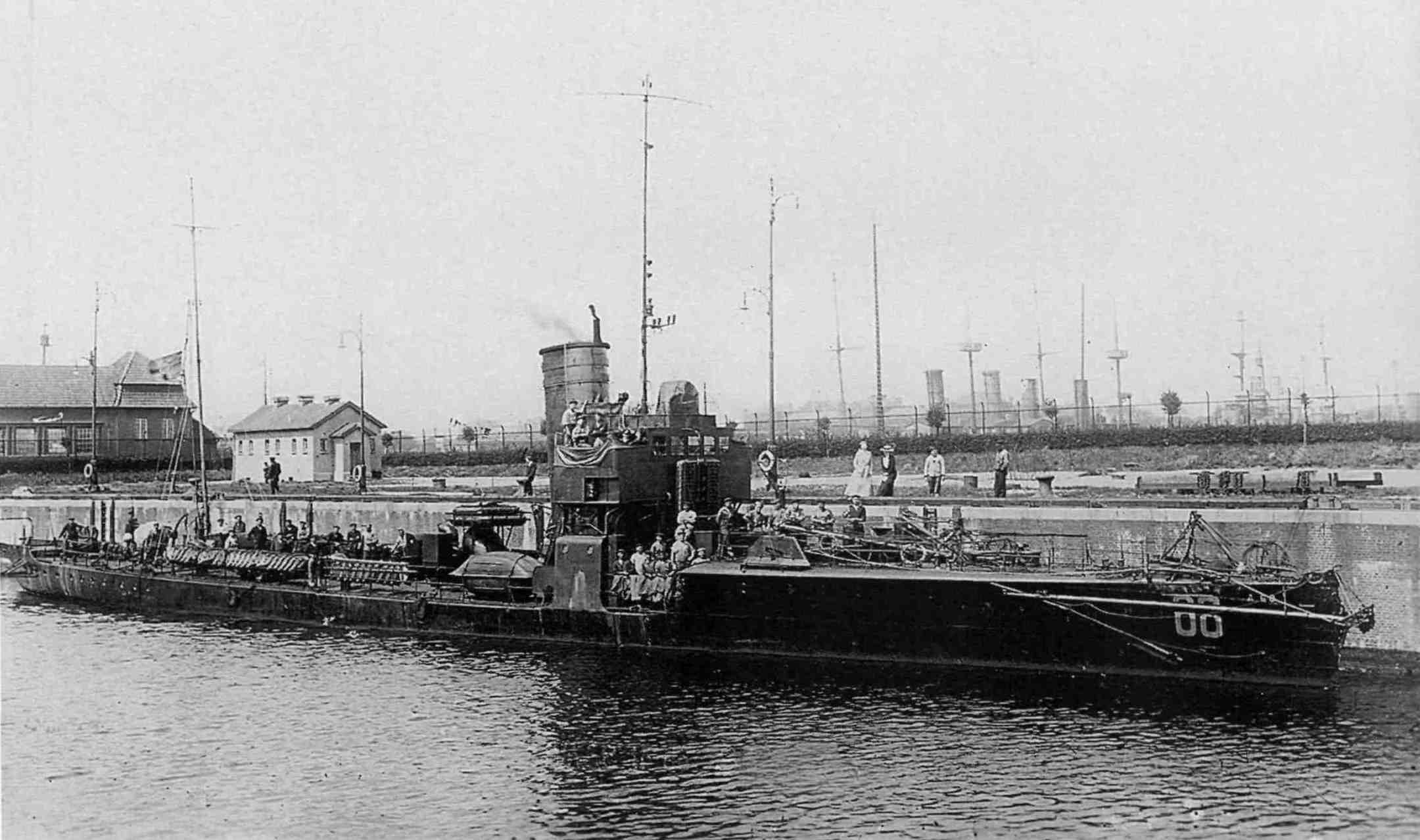
SM A 68, A-class coastal torpedo boat (1918)

The A-class torpedo boats were a class of single-funnelled torpedo boat or light destroyer designed for operations off the coast of occupied Flanders in the First World War. Six groups of vessels were built under the class between 1914 and 1918, increasing in displacement from 109 tons to 335 tons.

== Divisional torpedo boats ==
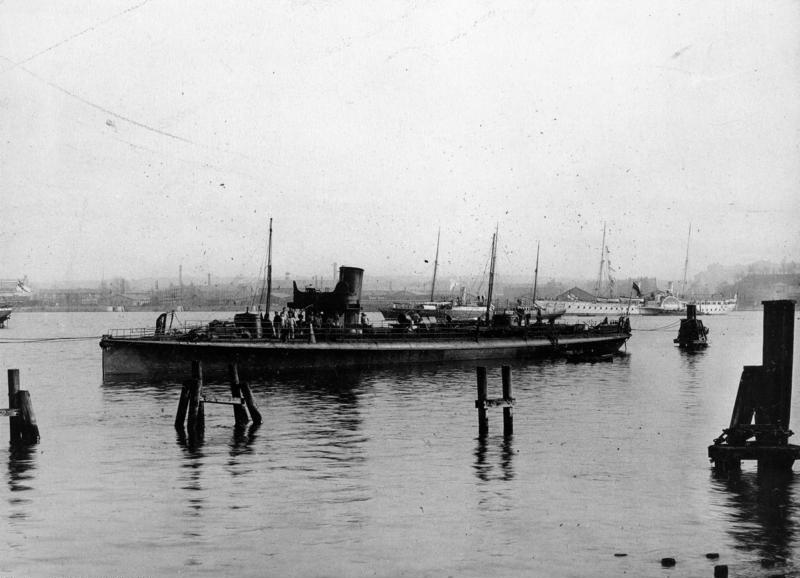
"Divisionsboot" D 7 (1892)

These boats had been the predecessors of the ocean-going torpedo boats. In the first years they had been used as torpedo boat leaders. D 1 – D 9 had been built by Schichau, Elbing. D 10 was built by Thornycroft.

Vessels	Launched	In Service	Comments.
D 1 – D 4	1886–1887	1887–1921	used for coastal protection in WW I; scrapped 1921.
D 5 – D 9	1888–1894	1889–1920	used for coastal protection until 1916, submarine school, 1919 mine sweepers; scrapped 1921.
D 10	1898	1898–1922	1914 coastal protection, submarine school, 1919 barracks ship; scrapped 1922.

== German ocean-going torpedo boats ==
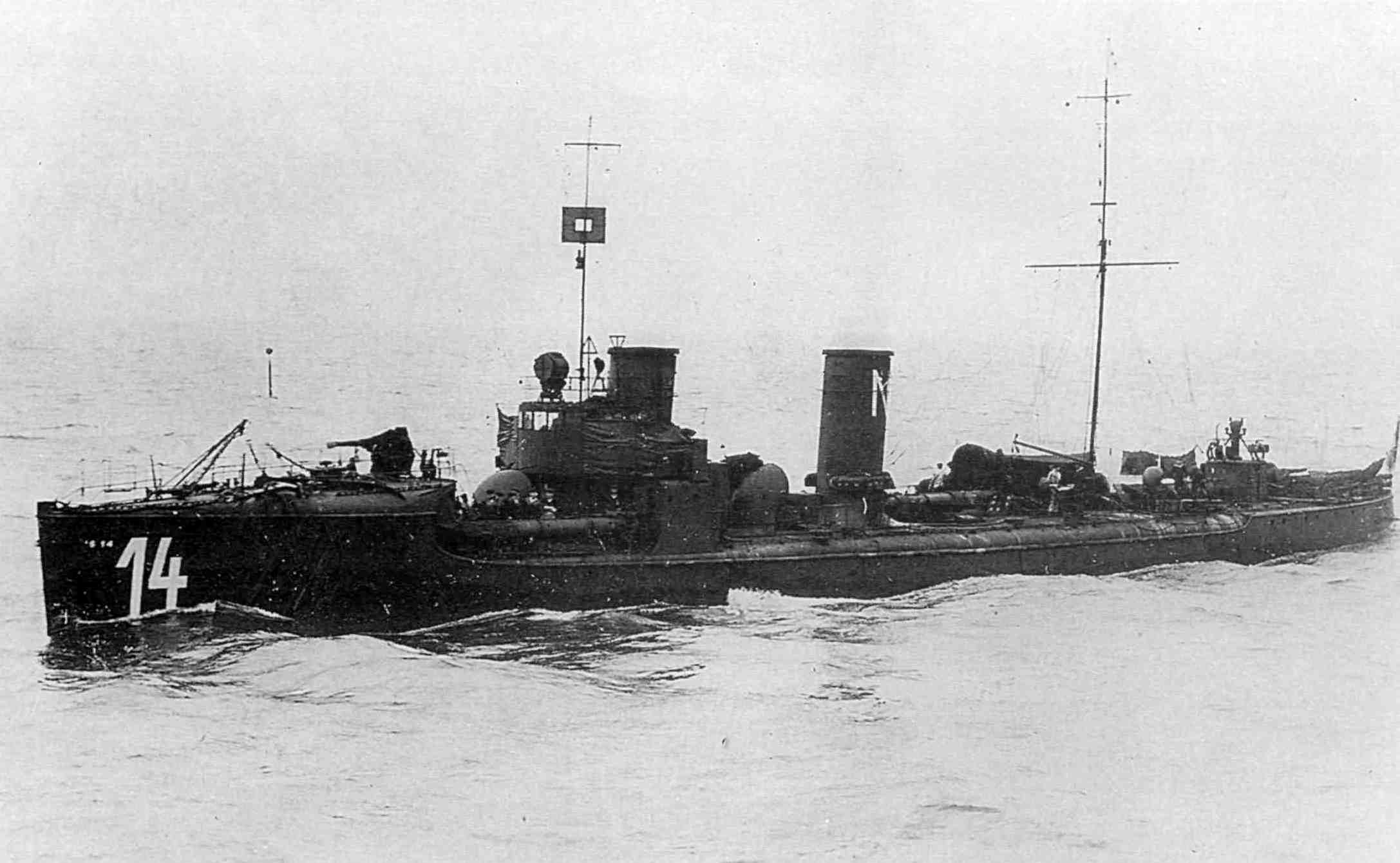
SM S 14 (V 1-class)

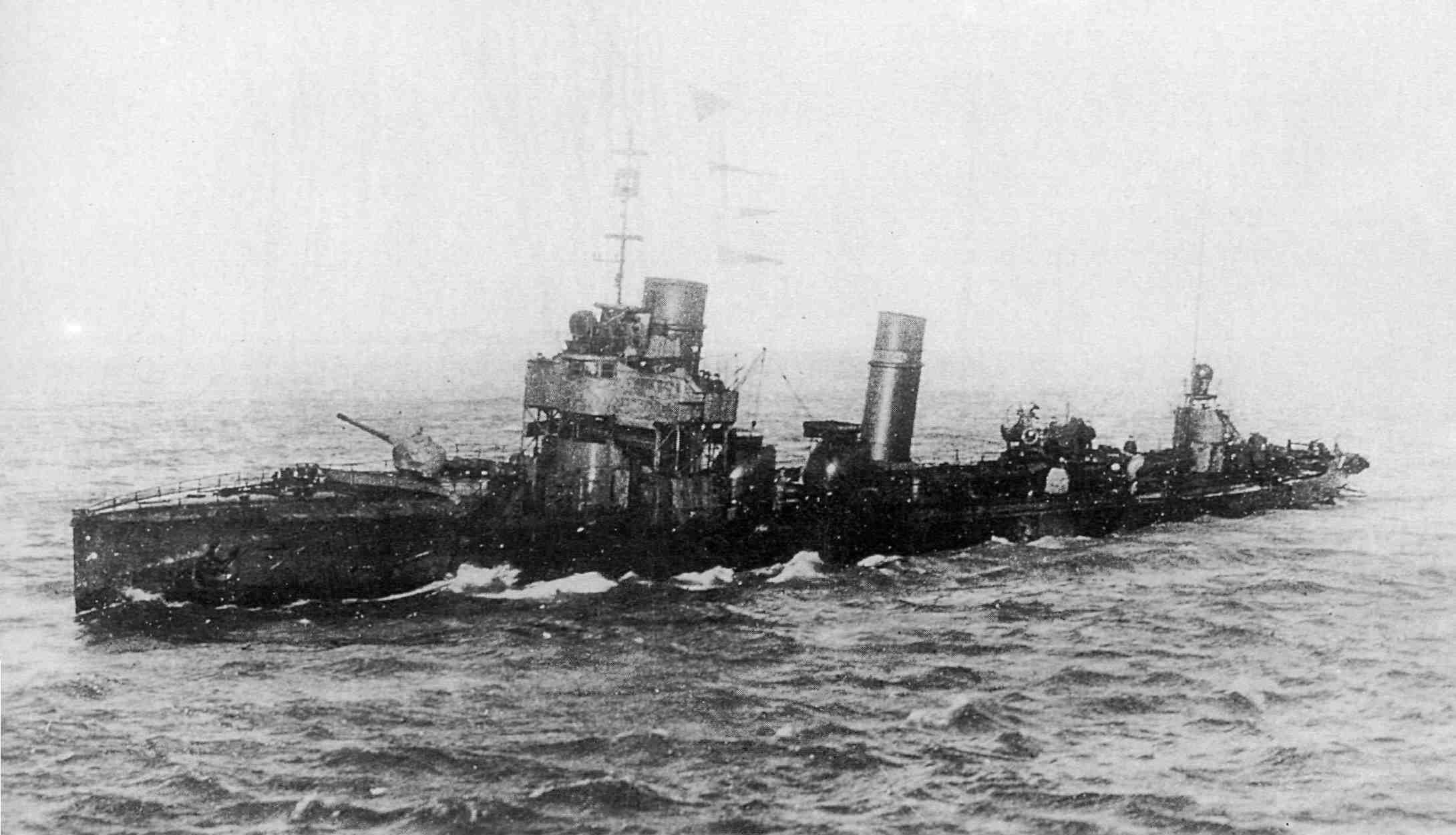
SM S 66 (V 25-class)

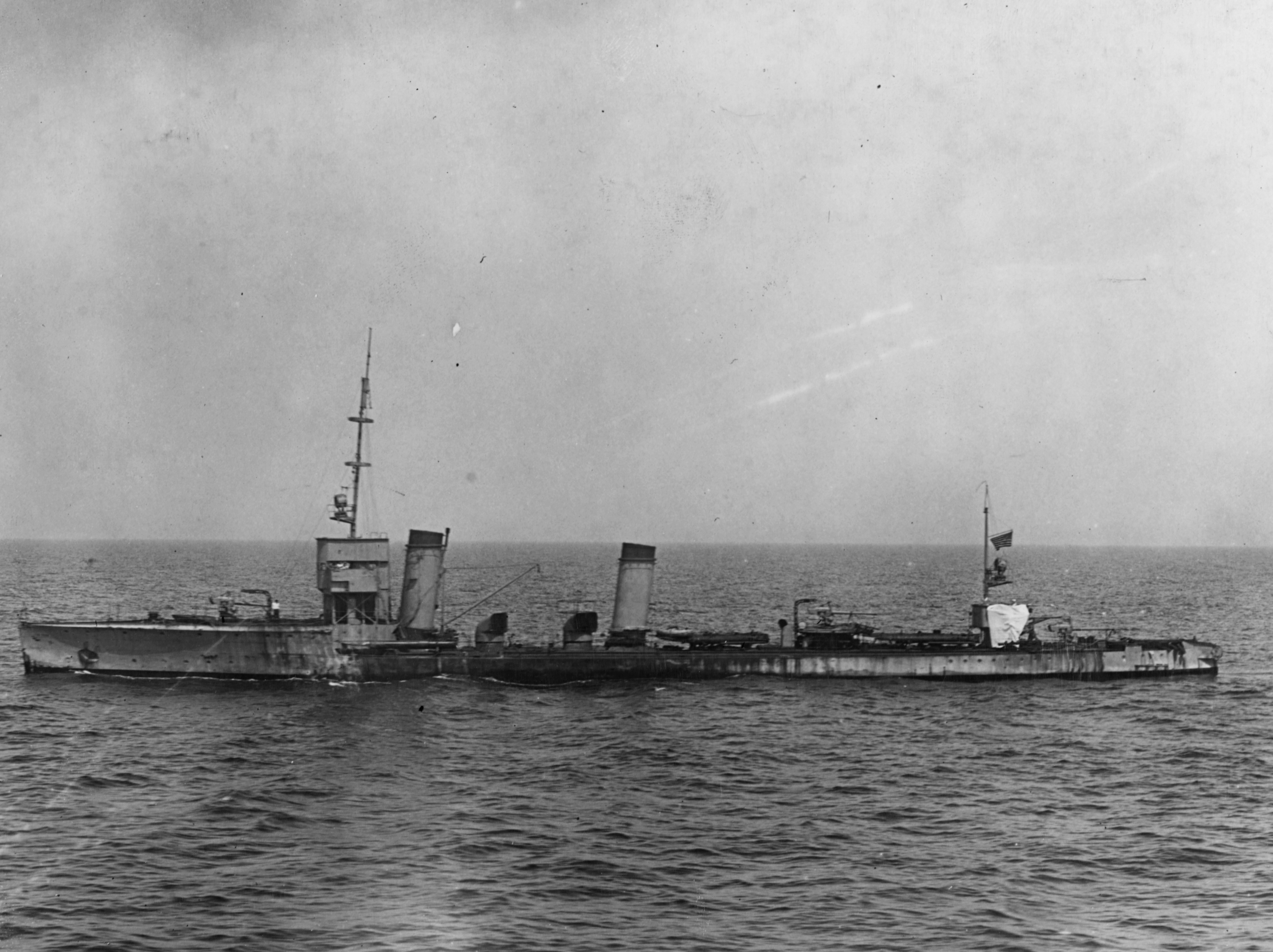
SM S 132 (V 125-class; in US service 1920)

The ocean-going torpedo boats (Hochseetorpedoboote) or large torpedo boats (Große Torpedoboote) had been in many ways the equivalent of the contemporary destroyers in other navies. But the gun armament had been lighter than British destroyers. In 1916 most of the boats of the 1913/1913 Mob-type had been refitted with three much more powerful 10.5 cm (4.1 in) SK L/45 guns, with 70 shells per gun.

- 1898 Type Large Torpedoboat (S90-class): 48 boats, built over 8 years
- 1906 Type Large Torpedoboat (S138-class): 60 boats (4 additional boats sold to the Turkish Navy) built over 5 years
- 1911 Type Large Torpedoboat (V1-class): 24 boats (2 additional boats sold to the Greek Navy) built to a smaller design
- 1913 / 1913 Mob Type Large Torpedoboat (V25-class): 71 boats, reverted to larger design; numbers increased due to First World War
- 1916 Mob Type Large Torpedoboat (V125-class): 36 boats, built for war service
- 1917 Mob Type Large Torpedoboat (G148-class): 22 boats, 13 scrapped before completion, 9 scrapped on slip

== Destroyer types ==
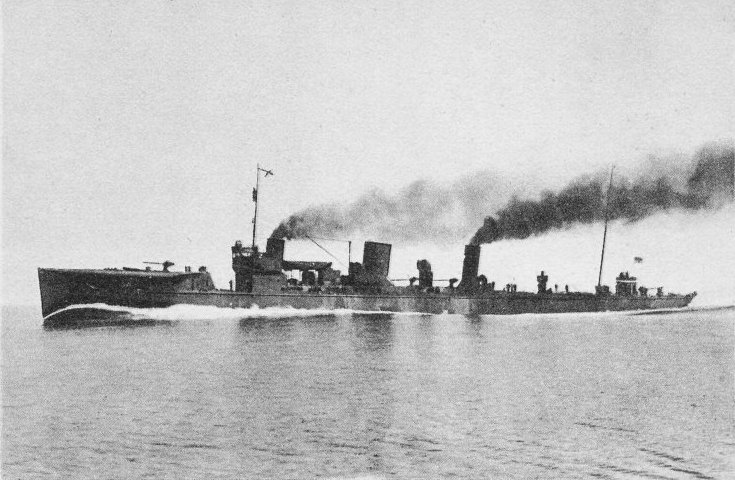
SMS V 99 (B 97-class destroyer)

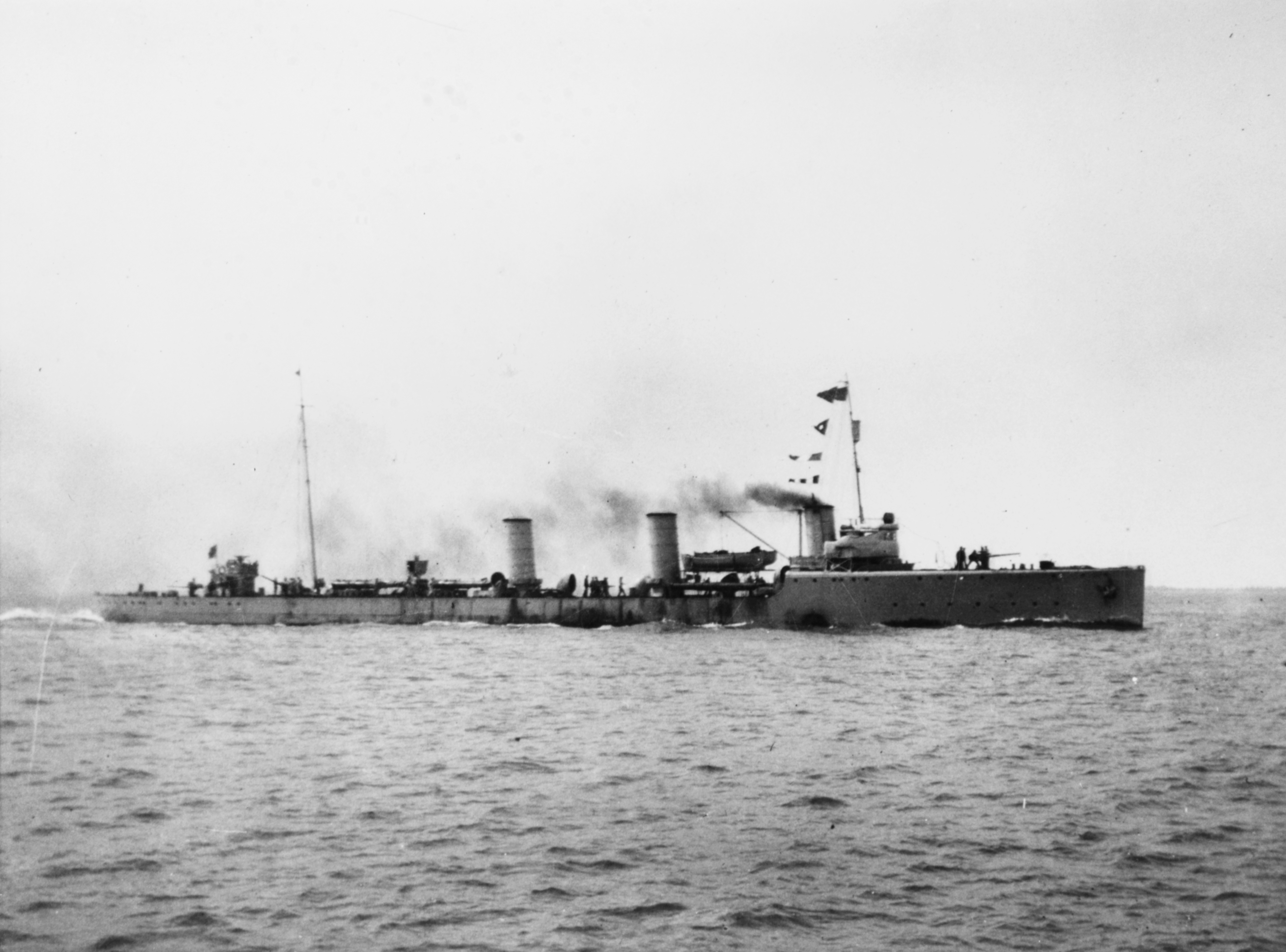
SMS G 101 (G 101-class destroyer)

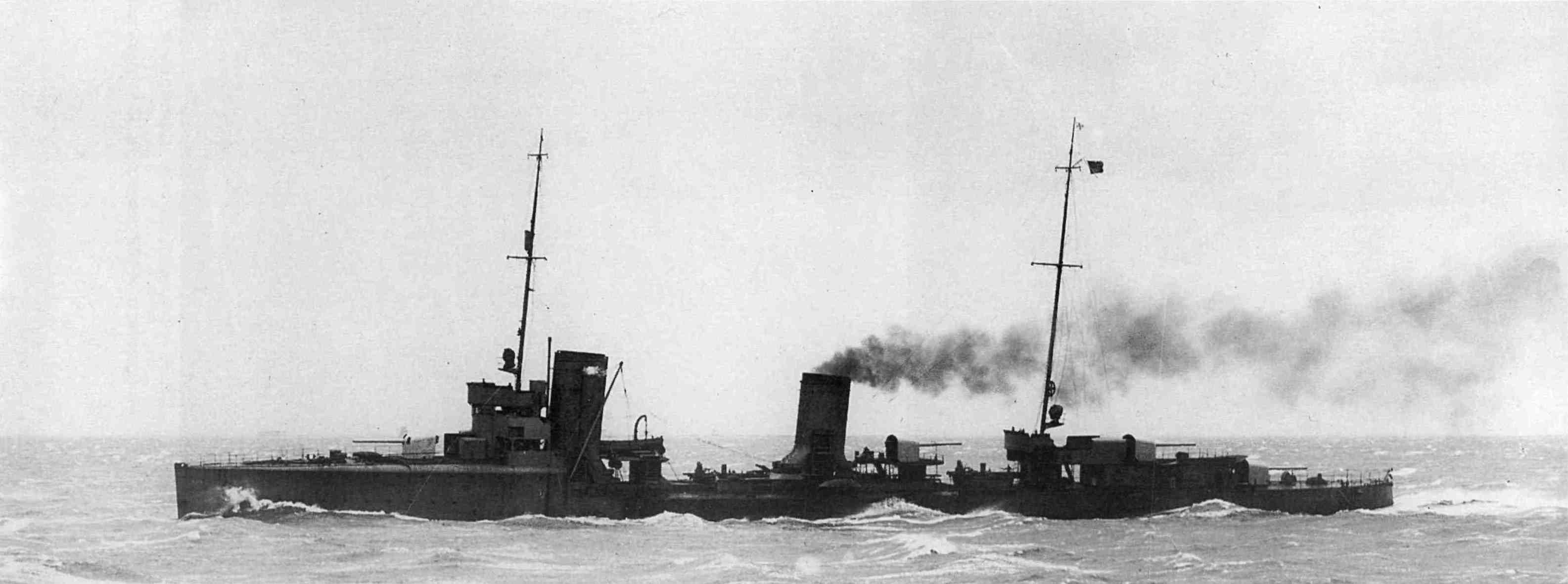
SMS S 113 (S 113-class destroyer)

The B 97 and G 101-class destroyers were re-armed in early 1916 by replacing the 8.8 cm guns with four 10.5 cm SK L/45 naval guns, which could fire a 17.4 kg (38 lb) shell to a distance of 9,460 metres (10,350 yd).

- Russian Destroyer Type (B 97-class): 8 destroyers
- Argentinian Destroyer Type (G101-class): 4 destroyers
- Dutch Destroyers (V105-class): 4 boats (SM V 105, SM V 106, SM V 107, SM V 108)
- Large German Destroyer, 1916 Type (S113-class): 12 destroyers: 10 scrapped before completion, 2 completed; SMS S 113 (2,377 tons, 4 × 150 mm guns and 4 × 60 cm torpedo tubes), SMS V 116 (2,320 tons, 4 × 150 mm guns and 4 × 60 cm torpedo tubes).
- Large Torpedo Boat, 1918 Mob Type: V170-class (23 boats, 1,268 tons, 4 × 105 mm guns and 6 × 50 cm torpedo tubes), S178-class (21 boats 1,268 tons, 4 × 150 mm guns and 6 × 50 cm torpedo tubes). None had been launched by the time of the armistice, after which all contracts were cancelled.
