= Premuda (disambiguation) =

Premuda is a Croatian island.

Premuda may also refer to:

== Ships ==
- Italian torpedo boat Premuda, Italian Regia Marina (Royal Navy) torpedo boat in commission from 1920 to 1939
- Yugoslav destroyer Dubrovnik, which served in the Regia Marina (Royal Navy) with the name Premuda during World War II from 1942 to 1943
- MS Premuda, a Croatian passenger ferry of the company Jadrolinija
