= French destroyer Amiral Sénès =

Destroyer of the French Navy

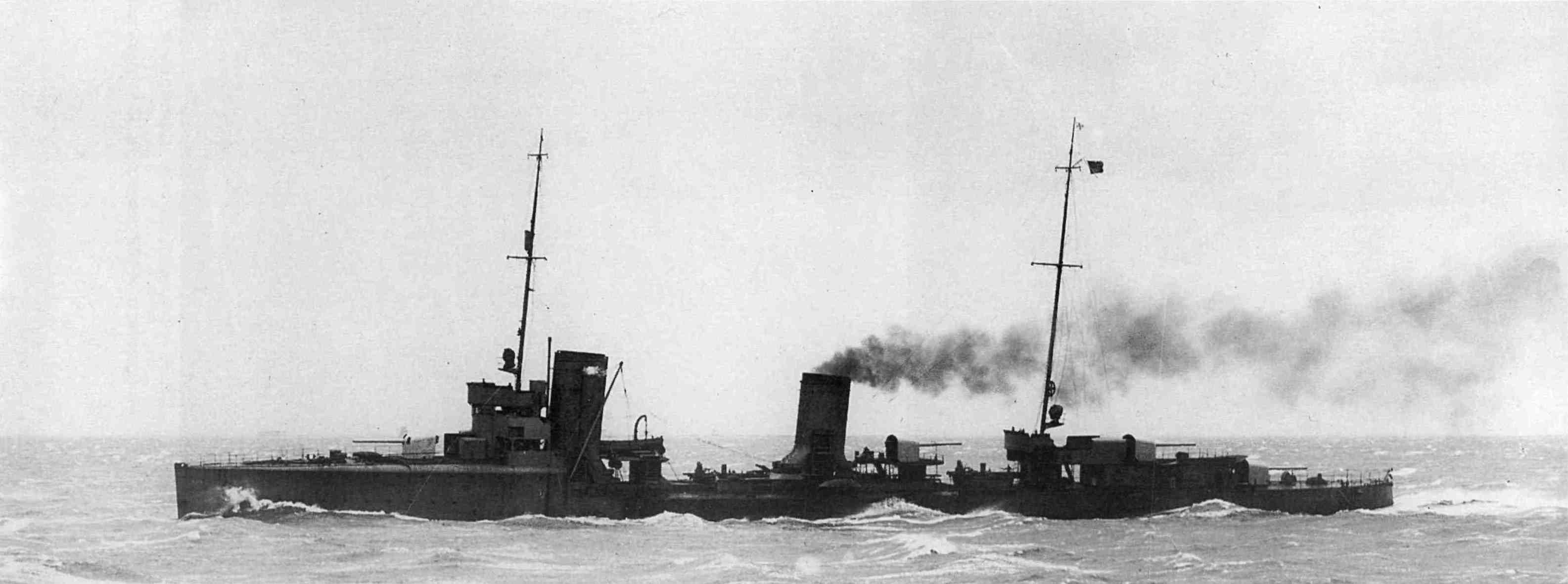

History

German Empire
- Name: S113
- Ordered: 1916
- Builder: Schichau, Elbing
- Launched: 31 January 1918
- Commissioned: 5 August 1919
- Fate: Transferred to the French Navy after cessation of hostilities

France
- Name: Amiral Sénès
- Acquired: 1 June 1920
- Fate: Sunk as a target, 19 July 1938

General characteristics
- Class & type: S113-class torpedo boat
- Displacement: 2,415 t (2,377 long tons)
- Length: 106 m (347 ft 9 in)
- Beam: 10.2 m (33 ft 6 in)
- Draft: 4.84 m (15 ft 11 in)
- Propulsion: Schichau geared turbines
- Speed: 36.9 knots (68.3 km/h; 42.5 mph)
- Range: 2,500 nmi (4,600 km; 2,900 mi) at 20 knots (37 km/h; 23 mph)
- Complement: 8 officers and 168 ratings
- Armament: 4 × 15 cm (5.9 in) UToF L/45 guns; 4 × 60 cm (23.6 in) torpedo tubes; 40 mines

The French destroyer Amiral Sénès was a 1916 Type Large Torpedo Boat (Großes Torpedoboot) of the Imperial German Navy during World War I. Built as SMS S113 (Note: "SMS" stands for "Seiner Majestät Schiff" (transl. His Majesty's Ship)) (Note: The "S" in S116 denoted the shipbuilder who constructed her, in this case Schichau-Werke.) she was the first ship of her class to be laid down, but the second and final ship of her class to be launched.

== Design ==
Traditionally, the Imperial German Navy designed its torpedo boats for the primary role of torpedo attack against hostile fleets while operating with the High Seas Fleet in the North Sea, rather than defence against enemy torpedo boats. The outbreak of the First World War, resulted in Germany seizing four large destroyers that were being built by Germaniawerft for Argentina (which entered service as the G101-class torpedo boat), and building the eight large B 97-class torpedo boats to take advantage of machinery that was being built by German suppliers for Russia. While much bigger than existing German torpedo boats, which led to concerns that they would not fit in with German tactics for use of torpedo boats, they proved successful in service equipping the 2nd Torpedo-boat Flotilla. The success of these larger ships resulted in a requirement for a second flotilla of large torpedo boats. The new class would be designed around its gun armament, and it was decided to switch to 15 cm (5.9 in) guns to ensure they would not be outgunned by British destroyers, which were expected to be fitted with 12 cm (4.7 in) guns soon. While they would be considered a destroyer in any other navy, the German Navy nevertheless retained the "torpedo boat" classification for these ships (although they, along with the B97s and G101s were often called destroyers). On 15 April 1916, the German Navy placed orders for twelve ships of this type - three ships each with the shipyards Schichau-Werke, A. G. Vulcan, Germaniawerft and Blohm & Voss.

S113 was 106.0 m (347 ft 9 in) long overall and 105.4 m (345 ft 10 in) at the waterline, with a beam of 10.2 m (33 ft 6 in) and a draft of 3.4 m (11 ft 2 in). Displacement was 2,060 t (2,030 long tons) design and 2,415 t (2,377 long tons) deep load. Four oil-fired water-tube boilers supplied steam at 18.5 atm (1,870 kPa) to two sets of steam turbines, which drove two propeller shafts. The machinery was rated at 45,000 shaft horsepower (34,000 kW), giving a speed of 36 knots (67 km/h; 41 mph). Armament consisted of four 15 cm SK L/45 guns and four 60 cm (23.6 in) torpedo tubes.

== Service ==
Built by the Schichau-Werke in Elbing, Prussia, (now Elbląg, Poland) with the yard number 983, S113 she was launched on 31 January 1918 and completed on 5 August 1918.

S113, together with sister-ship V116, formed the 12th Torpedo-boat flotilla at the end of the First World War. S113 never saw service during World War I as she was commissioned near the end of hostilities. S113 was at first retained by Germany after the end of the war, but after the German fleet interned at Scapa scuttled itself on 21 June 1919, Germany was required to hand over more warships and equipment, including S113, to the Allies under the Treaty of Versailles to compensate for the ships scuttled at Scapa.

The Allies decided to transfer 10 destroyers from the ships surrendered from the German and Austro-Hungarian to each of the French and Italian navies to replace wartime losses, with France choosing S113 as part of her allocation. She was transferred to the French Navy on 23 May 1920 and renamed Amiral Sénès. Amiral Sénès served in the French Navy until 1936 when she was used for gunnery practice and sunk on 19 July 1938.

== See also ==
- SMS V116
