= SMS V106 =

History

German Empire
- Name: V106
- Builder: Stettiner Maschinenbau A.G. Vulcan; Stettin, Germany (Now Poland)
- Laid down: 1914
- Launched: August 26, 1914
- Commissioned: January 25, 1915
- Decommissioned: 1918
- Fate: Scrapped 1920

General characteristics
- Class & type: V105 class torpedo boat
- Type: Torpedo boat
- Displacement: 340 tonnes (330 long tons) (standard); 421 tonnes (414 long tons) (full)
- Length: 62.60 m (205 ft 5 in)
- Beam: 6.20 m (20 ft 4 in)
- Draft: 2.50 m (8 ft 2 in)
- Propulsion: 2 × Yarrow steam boilers; 2 × AEG Vulcan steam turbines; 5,500 hp (4,100 kW)
- Speed: 27 knots (50 km/h; 31 mph)
- Range: 1,400 nmi (2,600 km; 1,600 mi) at 17 knots (31 km/h; 20 mph); 640 nautical miles (1,190 km; 740 mi) at 20 knots (37 km/h; 23 mph)
- Complement: 104
- Armament: 2 × 5.2 cm (2 in) L/55 guns; 2 × 45 cm (18 in) torpedo launchers

V106 was a torpedo boat of the Imperial German Navy, built in the A.G Vulcan Shipyard in 1914. She was originally ordered by the Dutch Navy and confiscated by Germany at the start of World War I; being scrapped in 1920.

== Design ==
V106 was designed by Stettiner Maschinenbau A.G. Vulcan shipyard as a torpedo boat for the Dutch Navy, as part one in a class of four sister ships (Z-1 to Z-4). She was 62.6 metres (205 ft 5 in) long overall and 62.0 metres (203 ft 5 in) at the waterline, with a beam of 6.2 metres (20 ft 4 in) and a maximum draught of 2.5 metres (8 ft 2 in). Displacement was 340 tonnes (330 long tons) normal and 421 tonnes (414 long tons) full load. Two oil-fired and two coal-fired Yarrow boilers fed steam at 18.5 standard atmospheres (1,870 kPa; 272 psi) to 2 direct-drive steam turbines rated at 5,500 PS (4,000 kW; 5,400 hp), giving a speed of 28 knots (52 km/h; 32 mph). 60 tonnes (59 long tons) of coal and 16.2 tonnes (15.9 long tons) of oil were carried, giving a range of 1,400 nautical miles (2,600 km; 1,600 mi) at 17 knots (31 km/h; 20 mph) or 460 nautical miles (850 km; 530 mi) at 20 knots (37 km/h; 23 mph).

She was designed to carry an armament of two 75 mm (3-inch) guns and four 450 mm torpedo tubes, but she was completed with an armament of two 5.2 cm SK L/55 guns (capable of firing a 1.75 kilograms (3.86 lb) shell to a range of 7,100 metres (7,770 yd)) and two 450 mm torpedo tubes.

== History ==
V106 was originally ordered by the Koninklijke Marine (Dutch Navy) as the torpedo boat Z-2 (along with her sister ships Z-1, Z-3 and Z-4), one of four Zeer groot (Dutch: Very large) torpedo boats to be built by A.G. Vulcan in their Stettin, Germany (now in Poland) shipyard. The four ships were taken over while still under construction on 10 August 1914 owing to the outbreak of the First World War. She was launched on 26 August 1914 and commissioned in the Kaiserliche Marine (German Navy) on 25 January 1915.

She was used as a training vessel and a tender during the war. She, along with sister ship V105, was allocated to Brazil in the Treaty of Versailles, but was almost immediately sold and broken up for scrap in Britain in 1920.

== See also ==
- German ocean-going torpedo boats of World War I

Sister ships

- ORP Mazur (1922) (ex-V105)
- ORP Kaszub (1921) (ex-V108)
- SMS V107
