= SMS V107 =

Coordinates: 56°32′N 20°58′E

History

German Empire
- Name: V107
- Launched: 12 December 1914
- Fate: Sunk by mine, 8 May 1915

General characteristics
- Class & type: V105 class torpedo boat
- Type: Torpedo boat
- Displacement: 340 metric tons (330 long tons)
- Length: 62 m (203.4 ft)
- Beam: 6.2 m (20.3 ft)
- Draft: 2.5 m (8.2 ft)
- Installed power: 5,500 ihp (4,100 kW)
- Propulsion: 2 shafts, AEG-Vulcan Steam turbines; 4 Yarrow boilers
- Speed: 28 knots (52 km/h; 32 mph)
- Range: 1,400 nmi (2,600 km; 1,600 mi) at 17 knots (31 km/h; 20 mph)
- Armament: 2 × 88 mm (3.5 in) guns; 2 × 450 mm (17.7 in) torpedo tubes

SMS V107 was a torpedo boat of the German Kaiserliche Marine. Originally ordered for the Dutch Navy from the German A.G. Vulcan shipyard as the Z-3, the ship was taken over by Germany during construction owing to the outbreak of the First World War. She was launched on 12 December 1914 and sunk by a mine in Libau harbour on 8 May 1915.

== Design ==
V107 was designed by Stettiner Maschinenbau A.G. Vulcan shipyard as a torpedo boat for the Dutch Navy, as part one in a class of four sister ships (Z-1 to Z-4).

She was 62.6 metres (205 ft 5 in) long overall and 62.0 metres (203 ft 5 in) at the waterline, with a beam of 6.2 metres (20 ft 4 in) and a maximum draught of 2.5 metres (8 ft 2 in). Displacement was 340 tonnes (330 long tons) normal and 421 tonnes (414 long tons) full load. Two oil-fired and two coal-fired Yarrow boilers fed steam at 18.5 standard atmospheres (1,870 kPa; 272 psi) to 2 direct-drive steam turbines rated at 5,500 PS (4,000 kW; 5,400 hp), giving a speed of 28 knots (52 km/h; 32 mph). 60 tonnes (59 long tons) of coal and 16.2 tonnes (15.9 long tons) of oil were carried, giving a range of 1,400 nautical miles (2,600 km; 1,600 mi) at 17 knots (31 km/h; 20 mph) or 460 nautical miles (850 km; 530 mi) at 20 knots (37 km/h; 23 mph).

The Dutch specified an armament of two 75 mm (3-inch) guns and four 450 mm torpedo tubes, but she was completed with an armament of two 88 mm guns and two 450 mm torpedo tubes. (Note: Gardiner and Gray state that V107 had 8.8 cm SK L/30 guns while Gröner states that 8.8 cm SK L/45 guns were fitted.)

== History ==
V107 was originally ordered by the Koninklijke Marine (Dutch Navy) as the torpedo boat Z-3 (along with her sister ships Z-1, Z-2 and Z-4), one of four Zeer groot (Dutch: Very large) torpedo boats to be built by A.G. Vulcan in their Stettin, Germany (now in Poland) shipyard. The four ships were taken over while still under construction on 10 August 1914 owing to the outbreak of the First World War. She was launched on 12 December 1914 and commissioned in the Kaiserliche Marine (German Navy) in March 1915.

On the night of 30 April/1 May 1915, V107 and sister ship V108 made a sortie into the Gulf of Riga, reconnoitering the island of Ruhnu and shelling lighthouses. The German Army had begun an offensive in the Baltic as a diversion for the Gorlice–Tarnów Offensive, and after a bombardment of Russian defenses of the port of Libau by German cruisers on 7 May, the Russians evacuated the city later that day. When German naval forces entered Libau harbour on the morning of 8 May V107 struck a mine on entering the port. The explosion blew off the ship's bow and V107 sunk as a result, with one crewmember killed.

== See also ==
- German ocean-going torpedo boats of World War I

Sister ships

- ORP Mazur (ex-V105)
- SMS V106
- ORP Kaszub (ex-V108)
