= Z-class torpedo boat =

Ship class

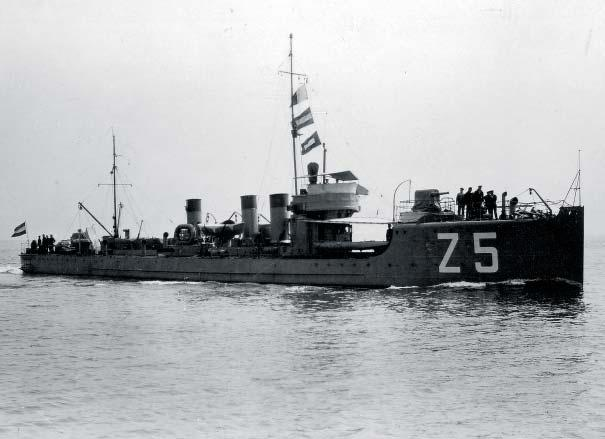
- Z-class torpedoboot Z 5

Class overview
- Builders: Nederlandsche Scheepsbouw Maatschappij (NSM); Koninklijke Maatschappij De Schelde; AG Vulcan Stettin; Fijenoord
- Operators: Royal Netherlands Navy; Imperial German Navy; Polish Navy; Royal Navy
- Subclasses: V105; Z 5; Z 1
- Built: 1914-1920
- In commission: 1915-1945
- Planned: 8
- Completed: 12
- Lost: 4
- Retired: 8

General characteristics V105 class
- Type: Torpedo boat
- Displacement: 340 tonnes (330 long tons) (standard); 421 tonnes (414 long tons) (full)
- Length: 62.60 m (205 ft 5 in)
- Beam: 6.20 m (20 ft 4 in)
- Draft: 2.50 m (8 ft 2 in)
- Propulsion: 2 × Yarrow steam boilers; 2 × AEG Vulcan steam turbines; 5,500 hp (4,100 kW)
- Speed: 27 knots (50 km/h; 31 mph)
- Range: 1,400 nmi (2,600 km; 1,600 mi) at 17 knots (31 km/h; 20 mph); 640 nautical miles (1,190 km; 740 mi) at 20 knots (37 km/h; 23 mph)
- Complement: 104
- Armament: 2 × 88 mm (3.5 in) guns; 2 × 45 cm (18 in) torpedo launchers

General characteristics Z 5 class
- Type: Torpedo boat
- Displacement: 263 tonnes (259 long tons) (standard)
- Length: 58.5 m (191 ft 11 in)
- Beam: 6.06 m (19 ft 11 in)
- Draft: 1.71 m (5 ft 7 in)
- Propulsion: 3 × cylindrical boilers; 2 × triple expansion engines; 5,500 hp (4,100 kW)
- Speed: 27 knots (50 km/h; 31 mph)
- Range: 425 nmi (787 km; 489 mi) at 20 knots (37 km/h; 23 mph)
- Complement: 48
- Armament: 2 × 75 mm (3.0 in) No. 4 guns; 2 × 0.5 in (13 mm) guns; 4 × 450 mm (18 in) torpedo tubes

General characteristics Z 1 class
- Type: Torpedo boat
- Displacement: 277 tonnes (273 long tons) (standard)
- Length: 61.32 m (201 ft 2 in)
- Beam: 6.31 m (20 ft 8 in)
- Draft: 1.85 m (6 ft 1 in)
- Propulsion: 3 × Water-tube boilers; 2 × AEG Vulcan steam turbines; 5,500 hp (4,100 kW)
- Speed: 27 knots (50 km/h; 31 mph)
- Range: 425 nmi (787 km; 489 mi) at 20 knots (37 km/h; 23 mph)
- Complement: 48
- Armament: 2 × 75 mm (3.0 in) No. 4 guns; 2 × 0.5 in (13 mm) guns; 4 × 450 mm (18 in) torpedo tubes

The Z-class torpedo boats were a class of twelve warships that served in the Dutch Koninklijke Marine, German Kaiserliche Marine, Polish Marynarka Wojenna and British Royal Navy. The Royal Netherlands Navy ordered eight Z-class torpedo boats before the outbreak of World War I, four were to be built by the German shipbuilder AG Vulcan Stettin, to be named Z 1 to Z 4, while four others were to be built in the Netherlands; Z 5 to Z 8. After the outbreak of World War I the four ships under construction in Germany where requisitioned for service in the German navy, resulting in the Dutch Navy to order another four ships to be built in the Netherlands. The ships saw action during both World War I and World War II. One of the German ships was lost in World War I, while one Polish and one Dutch ship sank during World War II. Another Polish torpedo boat sank in peacetime due to a boiler explosion.

== Ships ==
Z-class torpedo boats
Name	Laid down	Launched	Commissioned	Builder	Fate
V105 class
V105 Imperial German Navy; Mazur Polish Navy	1914	26 August 1914	23 March 1915	AG Vulcan Stettin	Served in the German Navy during World War I, was assigned to Brazil after the war but sold to Poland. Sank after being attacked by German aircraft on 1 September 1939 being one of the two first ships to sink during World War II as Germany invaded Poland.
V106 Imperial German Navy	1914	26 August 1914	25 January 1915	AG Vulcan Stettin	Served in the German Navy during World War I and was assigned to Brazil after the war. However she was scrapped in 1920 in Britain.
V107 Imperial German Navy	1914	12 December 1914	1915	AG Vulcan Stettin	Sunk by a mine on 8 May 1915.
V108 Imperial German Navy; Kaszub Polish Navy	1914	12 December 1914	1915	AG Vulcan Stettin	Served in the German Navy during World War I and was assigned to Poland after the war. Sank after a boiler explosion on 20 July 1925.
Z 5 class
Z 5 Royal Netherlands Navy; Blade Royal Navy	18 February 1914	1 April 1915	8 February 1917	Koninklijke Maatschappij De Schelde	Escaped to England after Germany invaded the Netherlands in World War II, commissioned in to the Royal Navy on 2 March 1942 as HMS Z 5, renamed in May 1943 to HMS Blade. Decommissioned on 9 April 1945 and scrapped in October 1945.
Z 6 Royal Netherlands Navy	18 February 1914	15 April 1915	8 February 1917	Koninklijke Maatschappij De Schelde	Escaped to England after Germany invaded the Netherlands in World War II, decommissioned on 4 October 1940 due to the bad condition of her machinery. Sold for scrap in March 1942.
Z 7 Royal Netherlands Navy; Z 7 Royal Navy	12 May 1914	10 May 1915	8 September 1916	Fijenoord	Escaped to England after Germany invaded the Netherlands in World War II. She was heavily damaged after running aground in December 1940 near Holyhead. Put in a dock in Holyhead, but the damage wasn't repaired. Decommissioned on 16 July 1942 and transferred to the Royal Navy on 1 October 1942. The British didn't use the ship and decommissioned her in January 1944 she was scrapped in 1947.
Z 8 Royal Netherlands Navy; Z 8 Royal Navy	12 May 1914	23 June 1915	22 September 1916	Fijenoord	Escaped to England after Germany invaded the Netherlands in World War II. Decommissioned and transferred to the Royal Navy on 1 October 1942. Decommissioned from the Royal Navy in January 1944. Scrapped in August 1944.
Z 1 class
Z 1 Royal Netherlands Navy	1914		1919	NSM	Decommissioned in 1933.
Z 2 Royal Netherlands Navy	1914		1921	NSM	Decommissioned in 1933.
Z 3 Royal Netherlands Navy	30 December 1915	23 March 1917	21 August 1920	NSM	Stationed in the IJsselmeer when Germany invaded the Netherlands in World War II. Rammed a dam and was set on fire on 14 May 1940 to prevent being captured. Refloated and scrapped in 1941.
Z 4 Royal Netherlands Navy	1914		1921	NSM	Decommissioned in 1933.
