= ORP Mazur (1922) =

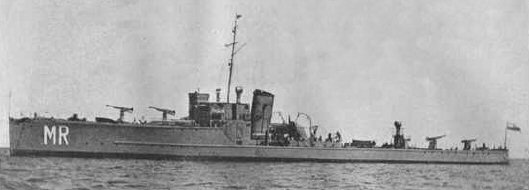
- ORP Mazur (c. 1935–1939)

History

German Empire
- Name: V-105
- Builder: Stettiner Maschinenbau A.G. Vulcan; Stettin, Germany (Now Poland)
- Laid down: 1914
- Launched: August 26, 1914
- Commissioned: March 23, 1915
- Fate: Assigned to Brazil, 1919; later sold to Poland

Poland
- Name: ORP Mazur
- Acquired: 1920
- Fate: Sunk 1 September 1939

General characteristics
- Class & type: V-105 class torpedo boat
- Displacement: 340 t, standard; 421 t, full
- Length: 62.60 m (205 ft 5 in)
- Beam: 6.20 m (20 ft 4 in)
- Draft: 2.50 m (8 ft 2 in)
- Installed power: 2 × Yarrow steam boilers; 5,500 hp (4,100 kW)
- Propulsion: 2 × AEG Vulcan steam turbines
- Speed: 27 knots (50 km/h; 31 mph)
- Range: 1,400 nmi (2,600 km; 1,600 mi) @ 17 knots (31 km/h; 20 mph); 640 nautical miles (1,190 km; 740 mi) @ 20 knots (37 km/h; 23 mph)
- Complement: 80
- Armament: Germany, 1915–1919: 2 × 88 mm (3.5 in) guns; 2 × 450 mm (18 in) torpedo tubes; Poland, 1922–30: 2 × 47 mm (1.9 in) guns; 2 × 450 mm (18 in) torpedo tubes; Poland, 1931–35: 4 × Schneider 75 mm (3.0 in) guns; 2 × machine guns; Poland: 1935–39: 3 × Schneider 75 mm (3.0 in) guns; 1 × Vickers 40 mm (1.6 in) AA gun; 2 × machine guns

ORP Mazur was a torpedo boat, then gunnery training ship of the Polish Navy. She was the former German torpedo boat V-105. She took part in the Polish Defensive War and was sunk by German bombers on September 1, 1939, as the first combat ship lost in the war.

== History ==
She was built in 1914 by Stettiner Maschinenbau A.G. Vulcan in Stettin, Germany (now in Poland). She was begun for a Dutch Navy order, as Z-1 (along with three sister ships Z-2 – Z-4), but after the outbreak of World War I she was confiscated by Germany and commissioned as torpedo boat V-105. During a division of the German ships after the war in December 1919, Poland was assigned only six torpedo boats, due to a reluctance of the British to strengthen newborn navies. V-105 was first assigned to Brazil, but then bought by a British dockyard and finally in 1921 exchanged with Poland for another torpedo boat (A-69), needed for spares, for extra charge £900 from the Poles. Poland also received her sister ship, V-108 as well (later the Polish ORP Kaszub), and four smaller torpedo boats. V-105 was in a bad condition and after some repairs in Rosyth, in September 1921 she was towed from Great Britain to Free City of Danzig, now Gdańsk.

=== Polish service ===
After a refit, she was commissioned in the Polish Navy on August 2, 1922, under the name ORP Mazur (named after the Mazurian people). She served in a torpedo boat unit (Dywizjon Torpedowców) and wore identification letters MR. In 1931 she was rebuilt as a gunnery training ship, and her armament changed to four 75 mm guns instead of torpedo tubes. The silhouette changed because of a lengthening of a bow deck and removing a well before a bridge. From 1935 she underwent a modernization, during which the ship lost a second funnel and after mast, returning to service in 1937. The fourth gun was replaced by 40 mm Vickers 2-pounder gun.

=== Demise ===
On the first day of World War II, September 1, 1939, ORP Mazur, commanded by Lieutenant Tadeusz Rutkowski, was in a port of Oksywie. At 2 pm she was at a pier, preparing to leave port, when she was attacked by German Junkers Ju 87s from IV./LG.1. The ship suffered one close hit and a hit amidships, and sunk still firing at the German aircraft. A crew member, although the ship was sinking, kept firing until waves washed him overboard, which was First Lieutenant Jacek Dehnel, the grandfather of the Polish poet and writer Jacek Dehnel. About 40 of the crew were killed. She was one of the first two ships sunk during the war, the other was an auxiliary ship (divers' tender) ORP Nurek. The wreck was scrapped by the Germans.

== Gallery ==
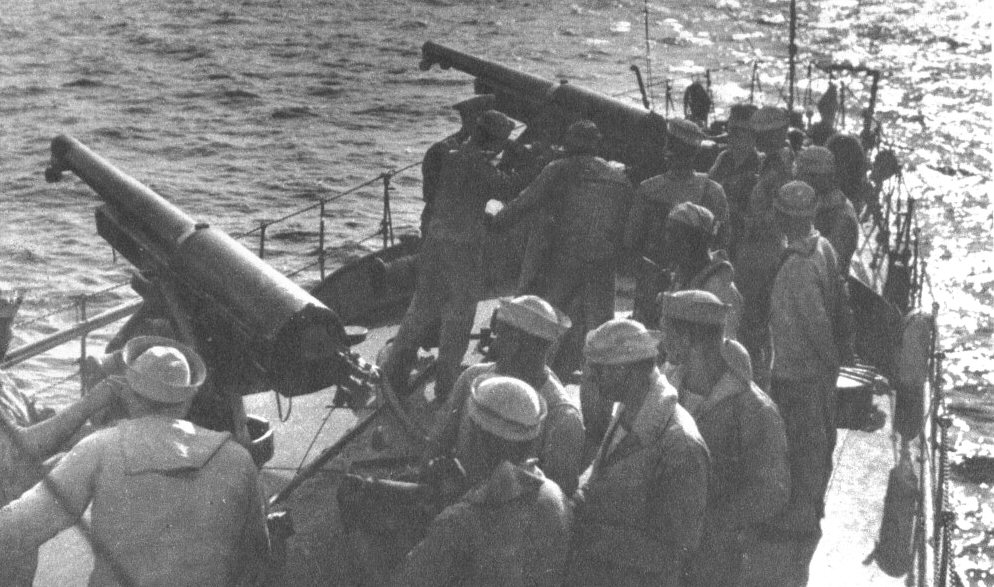
Bow 75 mm guns after refit

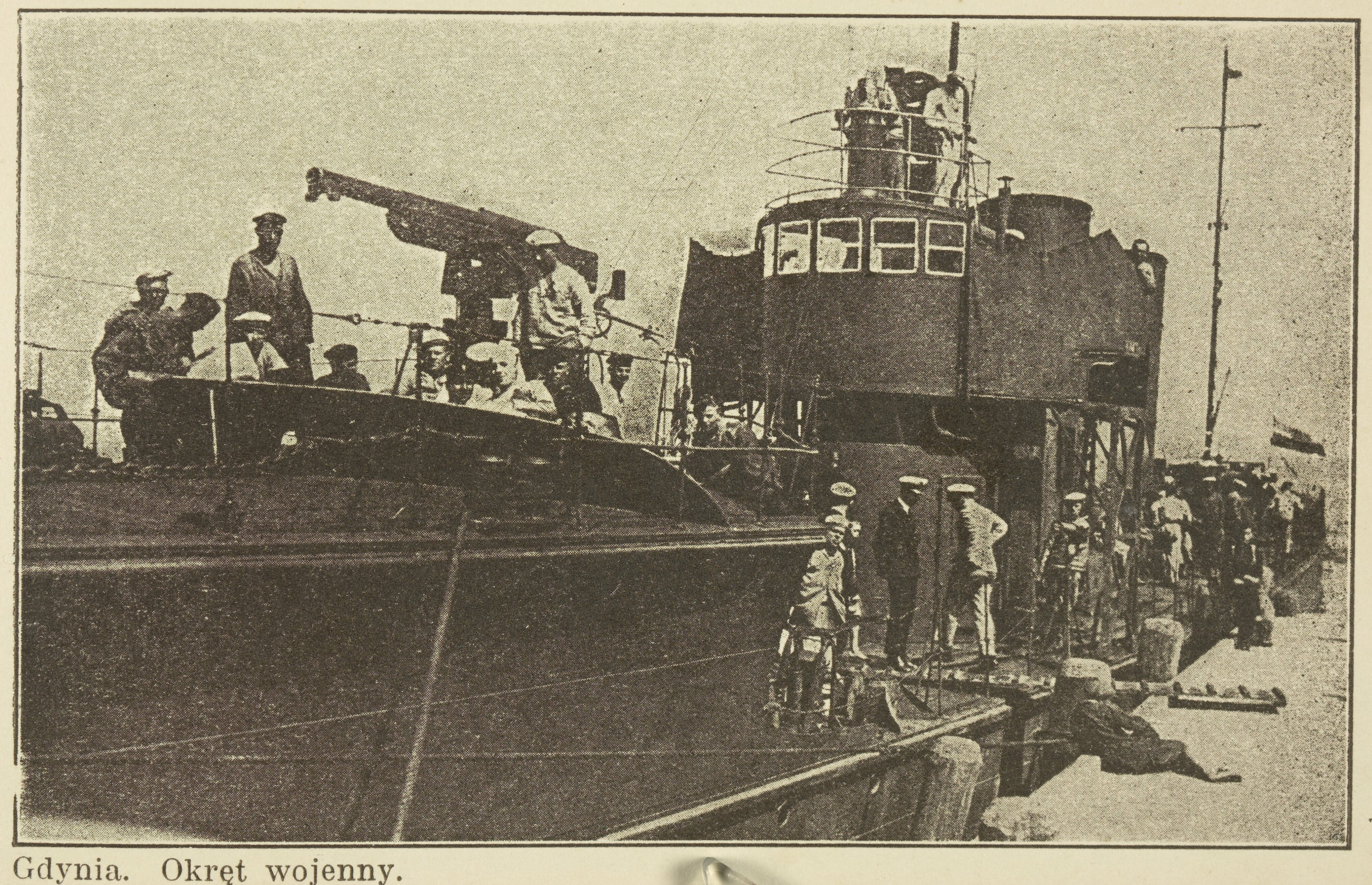
ORP Mazur in 1927-1931

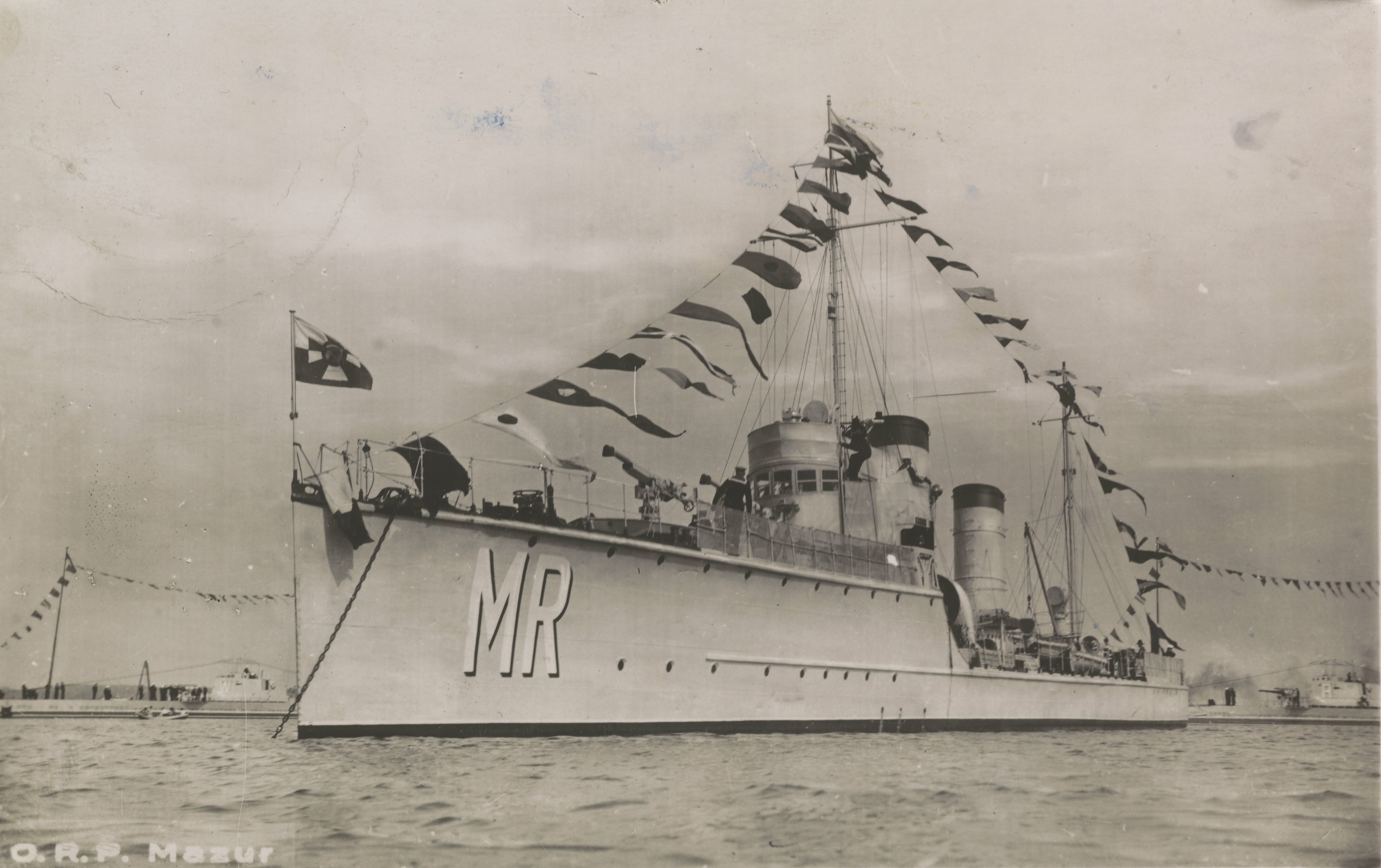
ORP Mazur in 1932-1934

== Bibliography ==
- Dodson, Aidan (2019). "Beyond the Kaiser: The IGN's Destroyers and Torpedo Boats After 1918". In Jordan, John (ed.). Warship 2019. Oxford, UK: Osprey Publishing. pp. 129–144. ISBN 978-1-4728-3595-6.
- Piwowoński, Jan (1989). Flota spod biało-czerwonej [The Fleet of the white-red ensign] (in Polish). Warsaw: Nasza Księgarnia. ISBN 83-10-08902-3.

== See also ==
- SMS V106
- SMS V107
