= Italian torpedo boat Premuda =

Italian Regia Marina torpedo boat

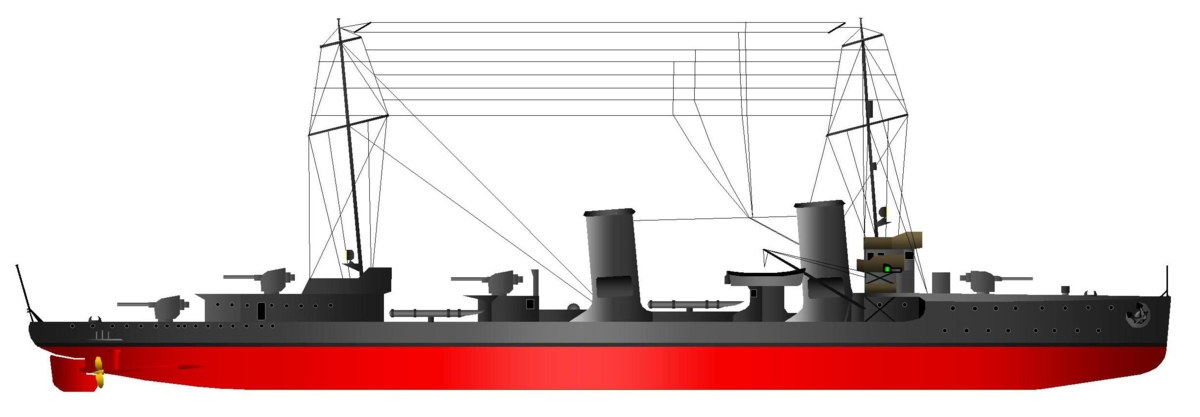

History

German Empire
- Name: V116
- Ordered: 1916
- Builder: AG Vulcan Stettin, Germany
- Launched: 2 March 1918
- Commissioned: 31 July 1918
- Fate: Transferred to the Royal Italian Navy after cessation of hostilities

Italy
- Name: Premuda
- Acquired: 1 June 1920
- Fate: Scrapped 1939

General characteristics
- Class & type: S113-class torpedo boat
- Displacement: 2,360 t (2,320 long tons)
- Length: 107.5 m (352 ft 8 in)
- Beam: 10.4 m (34 ft 1 in)
- Draft: 4.52 m (14 ft 10 in)
- Propulsion: 2 shafts; AEG-Vulcan geared turbines
- Speed: 35.2 knots (65.2 km/h; 40.5 mph)
- Range: 2,500 nmi (4,600 km; 2,900 mi) at 20 knots (37 km/h; 23 mph)
- Complement: 9 officers and 179 men
- Armament: 4 × 15 cm (5.9 in) UToF L/45 guns; 4 × 60 cm (23.62 in) torpedo tubes; 40 mines

Italian torpedo boat Premuda was a 1916 Type Large Torpedo Boat (Großes Torpedoboot) of the Imperial German Navy during World War I. Built as SMS V116 (Note: "SMS" stands for "Seiner Majestät Schiff" (transl. His Majesty's Ship)) (Note: The "V" in V116 denoted the shipbuilder who constructed her, in this case AG Vulcan.) she was the first ship of her class to be launched.

== Design ==
Traditionally, the Imperial German Navy designed its torpedo boats for the primary role of torpedo attack against hostile fleets while operating with the High Seas Fleet in the North Sea, rather than defence against enemy torpedo boats. The outbreak of the First World War, resulted in Germany seizing four large destroyers that were being built by Germaniawerft for Argentina (which entered service as the G101-class torpedo boat), and building the eight large B 97-class torpedo boats to take advantage of machinery that was being built by German suppliers for Russia. While much bigger than existing German torpedo boats, which led to concerns that they would not fit in with German tactics for use of torpedo boats, they proved successful in service equipping the 2nd Torpedo-boat Flotilla. The success of these larger ships resulted in a requirement for a second flotilla of large torpedo boats. The new class would be designed around its gun armament, and it was decided to switch to 15 cm (5.9-inch) guns to ensure they would not be outgunned by British destroyers, which were expected to be fitted with 12 cm (4.7-inch) guns soon. While they would be considered a destroyer in any other navy, the German Navy nevertheless retained the "torpedo boat" classification for these ships (although they, along with the B97s and G101s were often called destroyers). On 15 April 1916, the German Navy placed orders for twelve ships of this type - three ships each with the shipyards Schichau-Werke, A. G. Vulcan, Germaniawerft and Blohm & Voss.

V116 was 107.5 m (352 ft 8 in) long overall and 106.0 m (347 ft 9 in) at the waterline, with a beam of 10.4 m (34 ft 1 in) and a draft of 4.5 m (14 ft 9 in). Displacement was 2,060 t (2,030 long tons) and 2,360 t (2,320 long tons) deep load. Four oil-fired water-tube boilers supplied steam at 18.5 atm (1,870 kPa) to two sets of steam turbines, which drove two propeller shafts. The machinery was rated at 45,000 shp (34,000 kW), giving a speed of 36 knots (67 km/h; 41 mph). Armament consisted of four 15 cm SK L/45 guns (Note: Although unchanged, these guns were classed as 149 mm guns in Italian service.) and four 60 cm (23.6-inch) torpedo tubes.

When the ship entered Italian service, the torpedo tubes were replaced by German 50 cm (19.7-inch) tubes. In 1932, her 50 cm tubes were replaced by two Italian 450 mm (17.7-inch) tubes and a single 120 mm howitzer.

== Service ==
Built at Vulcan's Stettin, Prussia (now Szczecin in Poland), shipyard as yard number 456, V116 was launched on 2 March 1818 and was completed on 31 July that year.

V116, together with sister-ship S113, formed the 12th Torpedo-boat flotilla at the end of the First World War. While a large proportion of the Imperial German Navy, including 50 modern torpedo boats were required to be interned at Scapa Flow by the terms of the Armistice of 11 November 1918, V116 initially remained in German hands, however, forming part of the Eisernen Flottille (Note: English: Iron Flotilla), a volunteer-manned force of torpedo boats (which had their torpedo-tubes removed) used for security duties during the German Revolution of 1918–1919. On 21 June 1919, the German fleet interned at Scapa scuttled itself, and as a result, Germany was forced to hand over more warships and equipment, including V116, to the Allies under the Treaty of Versailles to compensate for the ships scuttled at Scapa. The Allies and the United States decided to transfer ten destroyers from the ships surrendered from the German and Austro-Hungarian to each of the French and Italian navies to replace wartime losses, with Italy choosing V116 as part of her allocation. She was transferred to the Royal Italian Navy on 23 May 1920 and recommissioned on 1 July 1921 under the name Premuda, classed as an Esploratori (English: Scout).

Premuda was employed as a cadet training ship between 1928 and 1930 and was rearmed in 1932. In 1938 the ship was reclassified as a destroyer. She was stricken on 1 January 1939.

== See also ==
- SMS S113
