= ORP Kaszub (1921) =

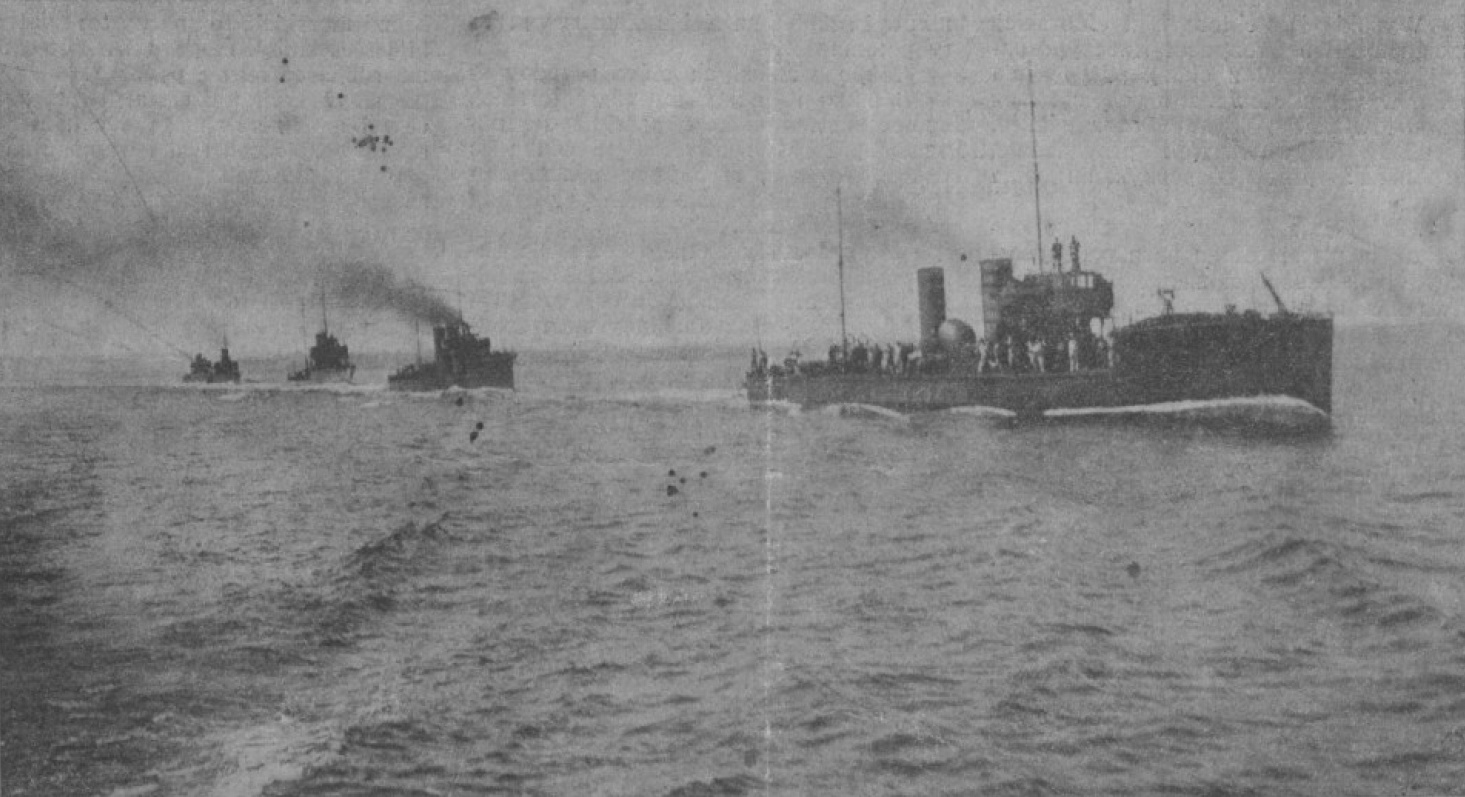
- ORP Mazur and ORP Kaszub (order unknown) leading three A 68 class torpedo boats, circa 1924.

History

German Empire
- Name: SMS V108
- Launched: 12 December 1914
- Fate: Transferred to Poland, September 1921

Poland
- Name: ORP Kaszub
- Acquired: April 1920
- Fate: Destroyed by a boiler explosion, 20 July 1925

General characteristics
- Class & type: V105 class torpedo boat
- Displacement: 340 metric tons (330 long tons)
- Length: 62 m (203.4 ft)
- Beam: 6.2 m (20.3 ft)
- Draft: 2.5 m (8.2 ft)
- Installed power: 5,500 ihp (4,100 kW)
- Propulsion: 2 shafts, AEG-Vulcan Steam turbines; 4 Yarrow boilers
- Speed: 28 knots (52 km/h; 32 mph)
- Range: 1,400 nmi (2,600 km; 1,600 mi) at 17 knots (31 km/h; 20 mph)
- Armament: 2 × 1 - 88 mm (3.5 in) guns; 2 × 450 mm (17.7 in) torpedo tubes

ORP Kaszub was a torpedo boat of the Polish Navy, and one of the first ships of that navy after Poland regained its independence in 1918. It was originally built by the German shipyard A.G. Vulcan for the Netherlands Navy as Z4, but was still under construction at the outbreak of the First World War in August 1914, and was seized by the Imperial German Navy, being renamed V108.

V108 served in the Baltic and for training during the war, and when the German Navy was broken up after the end of the war, was allocated to Poland, with the name Kaszub. It was sunk on 20 July 1925 by a boiler explosion.

== Description ==
V108 was 62.6 metres (205 ft 5 in) long overall and 62.0 metres (203 ft 5 in) at the waterline, with a beam of 6.2 metres (20 ft 4 in) and a maximum draught of 2.5 metres (8 ft 2 in). Displacement was 340 tonnes (330 long tons) normal and 421 tonnes (414 long tons) full load. Two oil-fired and two coal-fired Yarrow boilers fed steam at 18.5 standard atmospheres (1,870 kPa; 272 psi) to 2 direct-drive steam turbines rated at 5,500 PS (4,000 kW; 5,400 hp), giving a speed of 28 knots (52 km/h; 32 mph). 60 tonnes (59 long tons) of coal and 16.2 tonnes (15.9 long tons) of oil were carried, giving a range of 1,400 nautical miles (2,600 km; 1,600 mi) at 17 knots (31 km/h; 20 mph) or 460 nautical miles (850 km; 530 mi) at 20 knots (37 km/h; 23 mph).

The Dutch specified an armament of two 75 mm (3-inch) guns and four 450 mm torpedo tubes, but the ship was completed with an armament of two 8.8 cm SK L/30 guns and two 450 mm torpedo tubes. V108 had a crew of three officers and 57 other ranks.

== History ==
V108 was originally ordered by the Koninklijke Marine (Dutch Navy) as the torpedo boat Z-4 (along with sister ships Z-1, Z-2 and Z-3), one of four Zeer groot (Dutch: Very large) torpedo boats to be built by A.G. Vulcan in their Stettin, Germany (now Szczecin, Poland) shipyard. The four ships were taken over by Germany for incorporation into the German Kaiserliche Marine (Imperial Navy) while still under construction on 10 August 1914 owing to the outbreak of the First World War, with Z4 being renamed SMS V108. (Note: "SMS" stands for "Seiner Majestät Schiff" (His Majesty's Ship)) (Note: The "V" in V108 denoted the shipbuilder who constructed her.) The ship was launched on 12 December 1914 and completed in March 1915.

=== World War I ===
The newly completed V108 and V107 joined the 10th Torpedo Boat Flotilla in the Baltic Sea in April 1915. That month, the German Army had begun an offensive in the Baltic as a diversion for the Gorlice–Tarnów Offensive, with the Navy deployed in support of the Army's operations. On 24 April 1915, V108 shelled Russian troops near Palanga, Courland (now part of Lithuania). On the night of 30 April/1 May 1915, V107 and V108 made a sortie into the Gulf of Riga, reconnoitring the island of Ruhnu and shelling lighthouses.

From 3 to 5 June 1915, German naval forces, including V108 carried out an attempted penetration of the Irben Strait with the intention of mining the southern entrance to the Moon Sound, while the seaplane carrier Glyndwr's aircraft would attack a factory near Daugavgrīva. The presence of large numbers of Russian warships (including 16 destroyers and torpedo boats) resulted in the operation being abandoned, but on the return journey to Libau, Glyndwr ran into a previously undiscovered Russian minefield off Windau on 4 June, striking one mine, which badly damaged the seaplane carrier, causing serious flooding. V108 took Glyndwr under tow, and with the assistance of minesweepers took Glyndwr back to Libau.

In August 1915, V108 took part in the Battle of the Gulf of Riga, an attempt by German forces, supported by the High Seas Fleet, to enter the Gulf of Riga, destroy Russian naval forces in the Gulf and to mine the northern entrances to the Gulf in order to prevent Russian reinforcement. The attempt failed with Germany losing the torpedo boats S31 and V99 and the minesweeper T46, while failing to destroy any major Russian warships or lay the planned minefield. On 20 August, in one of the last actions of the battle, V108 took part in an attack on Pernau, with blockships being used to block the entrance to the harbour.

In 1916, V108 was relegated to training duties, remaining on training duties at the end of the war.

=== Polish service ===
In June 1919, Treaty of Versailles required that the German Navy surrender most of its remaining warships for division between the victorious powers. In December 1919, Poland was allocated six torpedo boats, which were to be supplied unarmed for police duties. One of the ships chosen by Poland was V-108, which was renamed Kaszub together with sister ship V-105 (which became Mazur) and four smaller A-class coastal torpedo boats. Kaszub, after refit at Rosyth Dockyard, arrived at Danzig on 3 October 1921. (Like all of the torpedo boats transferred to Poland, Kaszub suffered mechanical problems and was delivered under tow).

Kaszub was initially fitted with two 47 mm guns and two machine guns for service with the Polish Navy, but was rearmed in 1924–25, with two 75 mm guns and two 450 mm torpedo tubes, together with rails for laying mines.

=== Demise ===
On 20 July 1925, a boiler explosion wrecked Kaszub while in dock in Danzig, with the forward part of the ship sinking. Three crewmen died. The remains were salvaged on 26 July 1925 and scrapped.

== See also ==
- SMS V106
- SMS V107

== Bibliography ==
- Dodson, Aidan (2019). "Beyond the Kaiser: The IGN's Destroyers and Torpedo Boats After 1918". In Jordan, John (ed.). Warship 2019. Oxford, UK: Osprey Publishing. pp. 129–144. ISBN 978-1-4728-3595-6.
- Fock, Harald (1989). Z-Vor!: Internationale Entwicklung und Kriegseinsätze von Zerstörern und Torpedobooten: 1914 bis 1939. Herford, Germany: Koelers Verlagsgesellschaft mbH. ISBN 3-7822-0207-4.
- Halpern, Paul G. (1994). A Naval History of World War I. London: UCL Press. ISBN 1-85728-498-4.
- Gardiner, Robert; Gray, Randal, eds. (1985). Conway's All The World's Fighting Ships 1906–1921. London: Conway Marine Press. ISBN 0-85177-245-5.
- Gröner, Erich; Jung, Dieter; Maass, Martin (1983). Die deutschen Kriegsschiffe 1815–1945: Band 2: Torpedoboote, Zerstörer, Schnelleboote, Minensuchboote, Minenräumboote (in German). Koblenz, Germany: Bernard & Graefe Verlag. ISBN 3-7637-4801-6.
- Rollmann, Heinrich (1929). Der Krieg in der Ostsee: Zweiter Band: Das Kreigjahr 1915. Der Krieg zur See: 1914–1918 (in German). Berlin: Verlag von E. S. Mittler und Sohn.
