= Félix Théroinne =

French naval officer

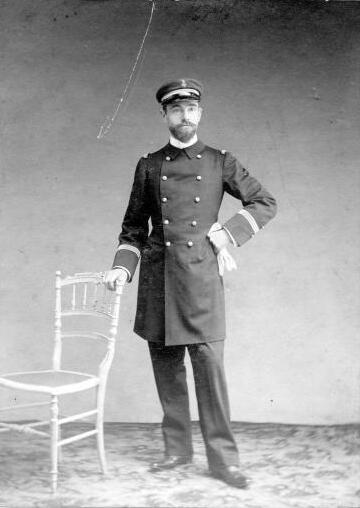
- Born: April 8, 1871; Brest, Brittany, France
- Died: October 28, 1914 (aged 43); Penang, Straits Settlements, British Empire
- Education: École navale
- Military career
- Allegiance: France
- Branch: French Navy
- Service years: 1889 – 1914
- Rank: First lieutenant
- Commands: Mousquet
- Conflicts: World War I: Asian and Pacific theatre of World War I; Battle of Penang †
- Awards: Legion of Honour (Knight)

Félix Alexandre Jules Théroinne (8 April 1871 – 28 October 1914) was a French naval lieutenant who was best known for his service and death at the Battle of Penang during the Asian and Pacific theatre of World War I.

== Biography ==
=== Early career ===
Théroinne entered the navy at the age of 18 and quickly rose through the ranks of the hierarchy, and three years later, in 1892, he was a midshipman. In January 1894, he embarked on the cruiser Nielly and in December of the same year, became an ensign. From 1897 to 1911, he successively served in the Mediterranean and Cochinchina squadrons, as well as in Brest on various ships (cruisers, avisos, submarines, etc.). Having become a lieutenant and knight of the Legion of Honour, he left in 1912 with the destroyer Fronde, for Saigon and remained there until 1914.

He was now the commander of the Mousquet and he reached the British naval base of Penang with the Fronde and the Pistolet.

=== Battle of Penang ===
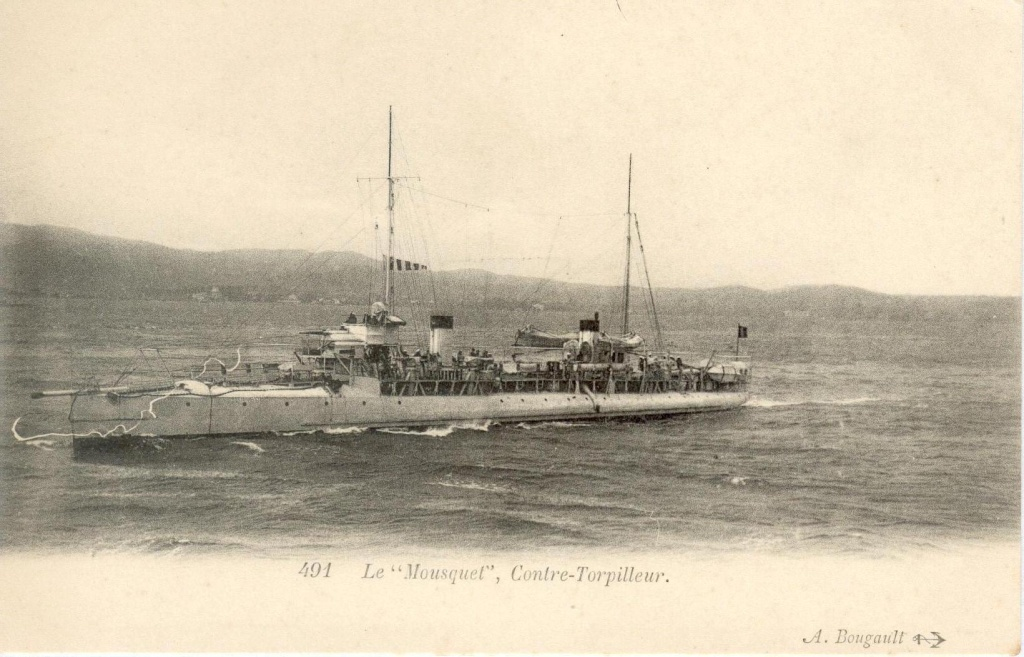
The destroyer Mousquet, commanded by Félix Théroinne.

When the Mousquet arrived at the port, the two ships which accompanied Théroinne were being at quay for technical problems, the latter ensured only the surveillance of the port. Théroinne paid no attention to the SMS Emden, which he mistook for a British ship. The Emden then approached the anchored ships and sank the Russian cruiser Zhemchug. Running to the sound of the cannon, Théroinne saw the corsair ship hoist the German flag and open fire in its direction. However the French commander couldn't use the 65 and 47mm pieces because of their short range. Only the torpedo tubes could inflict significant damage but the French ship was still too far from the enemy for their use. The Emden didn't have this problem as it had 105 mm guns with a range that's largely sufficient to reach the destroyer. The third shell exploded on the command bridge, mortally wounding Théroinne and killing several of his officers.

The Mousquet sank, taking with it almost all of the 5 officers and most of the crew. There would only be 36 survivors from the sinking and all of them took refuge in the Emden.
