= French destroyer Pistolet =

Destroyer of the French Navy

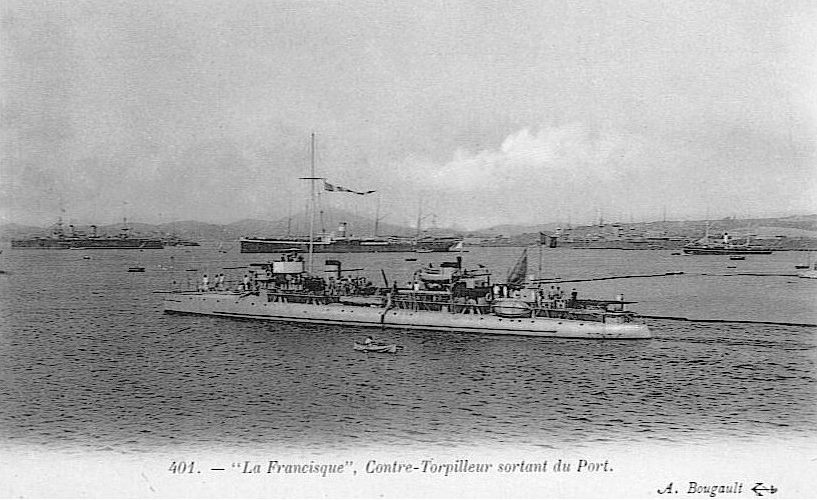
- A postcard of sister ship Francisque underway

History

France
- Name: Pistolet
- Namesake: Pistol
- Ordered: 22 May 1901
- Builder: Ateliers et Chantiers de la Loire, Nantes
- Laid down: September 1901
- Launched: 29 May 1903
- Commissioned: 21 September 1903
- Stricken: 30 October 1919
- Fate: Sold for scrap, 6 May 1920

General characteristics
- Class & type: Arquebuse-class destroyer
- Displacement: 357 t (351 long tons) (deep load)
- Length: 56.58 m (185 ft 8 in) (o/a)
- Beam: 6.38 m (20 ft 11 in)
- Draft: 3.2 m (10 ft 6 in) (deep load)
- Installed power: 2 water-tube boilers; 6,300 ihp (4,698 kW)
- Propulsion: 2 shafts; 2 triple-expansion steam engines
- Speed: 28 knots (52 km/h; 32 mph)
- Range: 2,300 nmi (4,300 km; 2,600 mi) at 10 knots (19 km/h; 12 mph)
- Complement: 4 officers and 58 enlisted men
- Armament: 1 × single 65 mm (2.6 in) gun; 6 × single 47 mm (1.9 in) guns; 2 × single 381 mm (15 in) torpedo tubes

Pistolet was an Arquebuse-class destroyer built for the French Navy (Marine nationale) in the first decade of the 20th century. Completed in 1903, the ship was initially assigned to the Northern Squadron (Escadre du Nord) in the English Channel. She was transferred to French Indochina the following year and remained there for the next decade. She was present for the Battle of Penang during World War I, but was not able to engage the German cruiser SMS Emden. Pistolet returned to France in 1916 and patrolled the western Mediterranean Sea for the rest of the war. She was ultimately sold to ship breakers in 1920.

== Design and description ==
The Arquebuse class was designed as a faster version of the preceding Durandal-class destroyers. The ships had an overall length of 56.58 meters (185 ft 8 in), a beam of 6.38 meters (20 ft 11 in), and a maximum draft of 3.2 meters (10 ft 6 in). They normally displaced 307 metric tons (302 long tons) and 357 t (351 long tons) at deep load. The two vertical triple-expansion steam engines each drove one propeller shaft using steam provided by two du Temple Guyot boilers. The engines were designed to produce a total of 6,300 indicated horsepower (4,700 kW) for a designed speed of 28 knots (52 km/h; 32 mph), all the ships exceeded their contracted speed during their sea trials. Pistolet reached a speed of 29 knots (54 km/h; 33 mph) from 6,573 ihp (4,901 kW) during her sea trials on 23 July 1903. The ships carried enough coal to give them a range of 2,300 nautical miles (4,300 km; 2,600 mi) at 10 knots (19 km/h; 12 mph). Their crew consisted of four officers and fifty-eight enlisted men.

The main armament of the Arquebuse-class ships consisted of a single Canon de 65 mm (2.6 in) Modèle 1891 gun forward of the bridge and six 47-millimeter (1.9 in) Hotchkiss guns in single mounts, three on each broadside. They were fitted with two single rotating mounts for 381-millimeter (15 in) torpedo tubes on the centerline, one between the funnels amidships and the other on the stern.

== Service history ==
Pistolet (Pistol) was ordered from Ateliers et Chantiers de la Loire on 22 May 1901 and the ship was laid down in September at its shipyard in Nantes. She was launched on 29 May 1903 and conducted her sea trials from June to August that year. The ship was commissioned on 21 September after their completion. She was assigned to the Northern Squadron before completion, on 9 September, to replace the old destroyer Escopette. She was shortly thereafter transferred to the Far East Squadron (escadre de l'Extrême-Orient) based in French Indochina, arriving there in April 1904. She traveled there in company with the protected cruiser D'Assas and several other Arquebuse-class destroyers.

In June 1905, the destroyer was assigned to the newly formed 2nd China Sea Torpedo Boat Flotilla (2^{e} Flotille des torpilleurs des mers de Chine) of the renamed Naval Division of the Far East (Division navale de l'Extrême-Orient). In 1911 the division consisted of the armored cruisers Dupleix and Kléber, the old torpedo cruiser D'Iberville, two other destroyers, six torpedo boats, and four submarines, along with a number of smaller vessels.

=== World War I ===
At the start of World War I in August 1914, the division included Pistolet, along with the armored cruisers Montcalm and Dupleix, D'Iberville, and the destroyers Mousquet, and Fronde. The unit was based in Saigon in French Indochina. The destroyers and D'Iberville were initially sent to patrol the Strait of Malacca while the armored cruisers were sent north to join the search for the German East Asia Squadron. D'Iberville and the destroyers conducted patrols in the strait for the German unprotected cruiser SMS Geier, which was known to be passing through the area at the time; the French ships failed to locate the German vessel.

Pistolet was present in the harbor at George Town, Penang, on 27 October, moored alongside her sister Fronde. The other major Triple Entente ships in the harbor included D'Iberville and the Russian protected cruiser Zhemchug. In the early hours of 28 October, the German light cruiser SMS Emden entered the harbor to attack the Entente vessels there. In the ensuing Battle of Penang, Emden quickly torpedoed and sank Zhemchug before turning to flee. As the German ship departed, she encountered and sank Mousquet. Unlike the other French warships, Pistolet could not open fire on the raider, as she was moored inboard of Fronde and could not bring her guns to bear.

In 1915, Pistolet received new boilers at Saigon. She returned home later that year, arriving back in Toulon on 19 January 1916. The ship was then assigned to the Western Mediterranean Patrol Division, where she operated for the next two years. On 21 May, she arrived in Toulon having escorted the submarine Gay-Lussac from Brindisi, Italy. The war having ended in November 1918, Pistolet was struck from the naval register on 30 October 1919 and eventually sold to ship breakers in Toulon on 6 May 1920.

== Bibliography ==
- Burgoyne, Alan H., ed. (1911). "The French Navy". The Navy League Annual. V. London: John Murray: 57–66. OCLC 809125514.
- Corbett, Julian Stafford (1920). Naval Operations: To The Battle of the Falklands, December 1914. Vol. I. London: Longmans, Green & Co. OCLC 174823980.
- Couhat, Jean Labayle (1974). French Warships of World War I. London: Ian Allan. ISBN 0-7110-0445-5.
- Garier, Gérard (2002). L'odyssée technique et humaine du sous-marin en France [The Technical and Human Odyssey of the Submarine in France: Put to the Test by the Great War] (in French). Vol. 3, part 2: A l'épreuve de la Grande Guerre. Nantes: Marines éditions. ISBN 2-909675-81-5.
- Jordan, John & Caresse, Philippe (2019). French Armoured Cruisers 1887–1932. Barnsley, UK: Seaforth Publishing. ISBN 978-1-5267-4118-9.
- Le Masson, Henri (1967). Histoire du Torpilleur en France [History of the Torpedo-armed Ship in France]. Paris: Académie de marine. OCLC 491016784.
- Roberts, Stephen S. (2021). French Warships in the Age of Steam 1859–1914: Design, Construction, Careers and Fates. Barnsley, UK: Seaforth Publishing. ISBN 978-1-5267-4533-0.
- Staff, Gary (2011). Battle on the Seven Seas. Barnsley, UK: Pen & Sword Maritime. ISBN 978-1-84884-182-6.
- Stanglini, Ruggero & Cosentino, Michelle (2022). The French Fleet: Ships, Strategy and Operations, 1870-1918. Barnsley, UK: Seaforth Publishing. ISBN 978-1-5267-0131-2.
