= Fronde (disambiguation) =

The Fronde was a series of civil wars in France in 1648 to 1653.

Fronde may also refer to:

- La Fronde (newspaper), a French feminist newspaper
- French destroyer Fronde

== See also ==
- Frond, a large compound leaf
- Sling (weapon)
- Thierry la Fronde, a French television series
