= Jerejak Island =

Islet off the coast of Penang Island in Malaysia

Native name: Pulau Jerejak
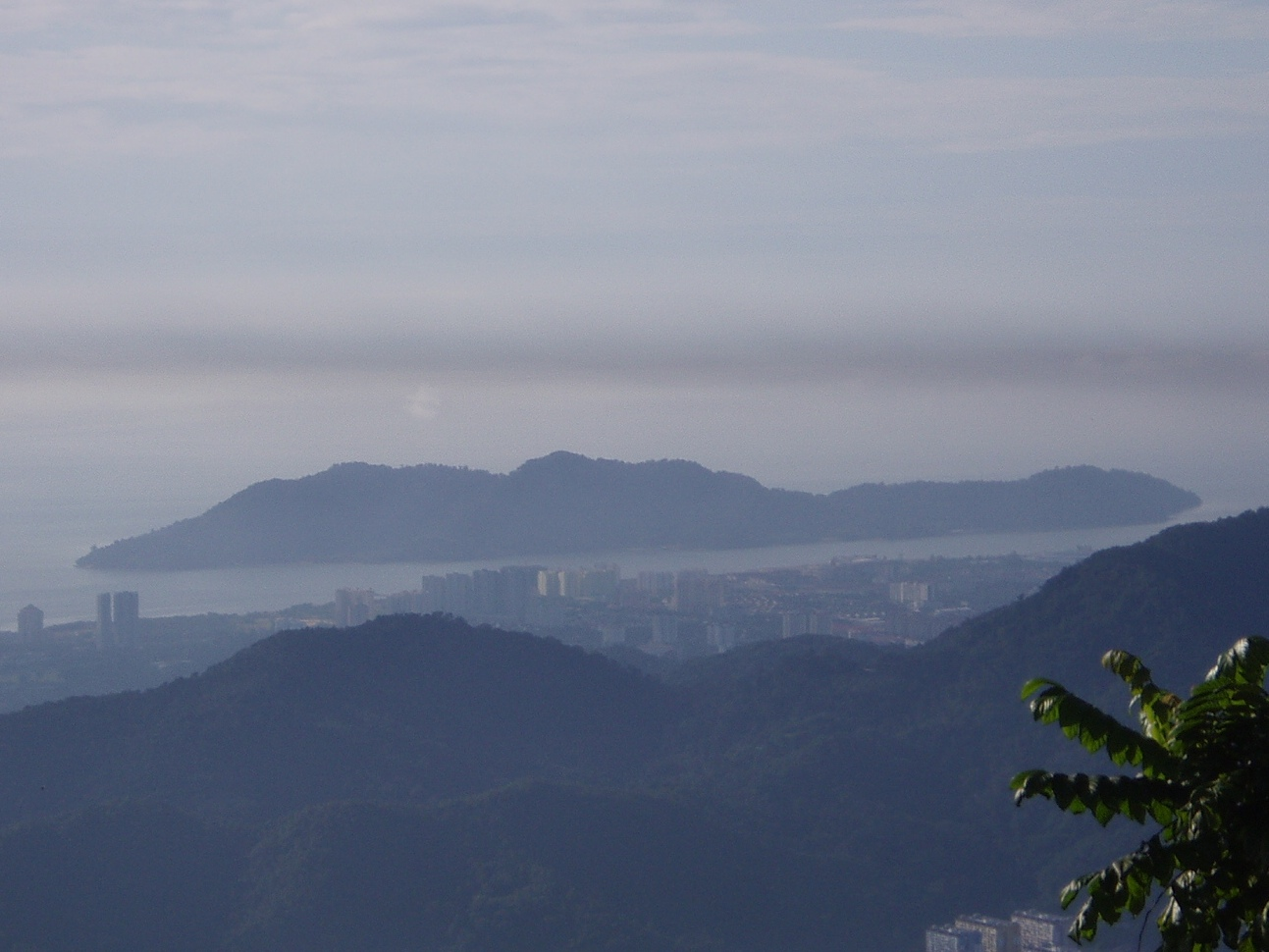

Geography
- Location: Penang Strait
- Coordinates: 5°19′31.9872″N 100°19′25.575″E
- Area: 3.62 km^{2} (1.40 sq mi)

Administration
- Malaysia
- State: Penang
- City: George Town
- District: Northeast
- Mukim: Paya Terubong

Jerejak Island is a 3.62 km^{2} (362 ha) islet off the eastern coast of Penang Island in the Malaysian state of Penang. It is also a short ferry ride from Bayan Lepas, a suburb of George Town. It was formerly the main leper asylum for the Straits Settlements (1868), a Quarantine Station (1875) and a penal colony (1969).

== History ==
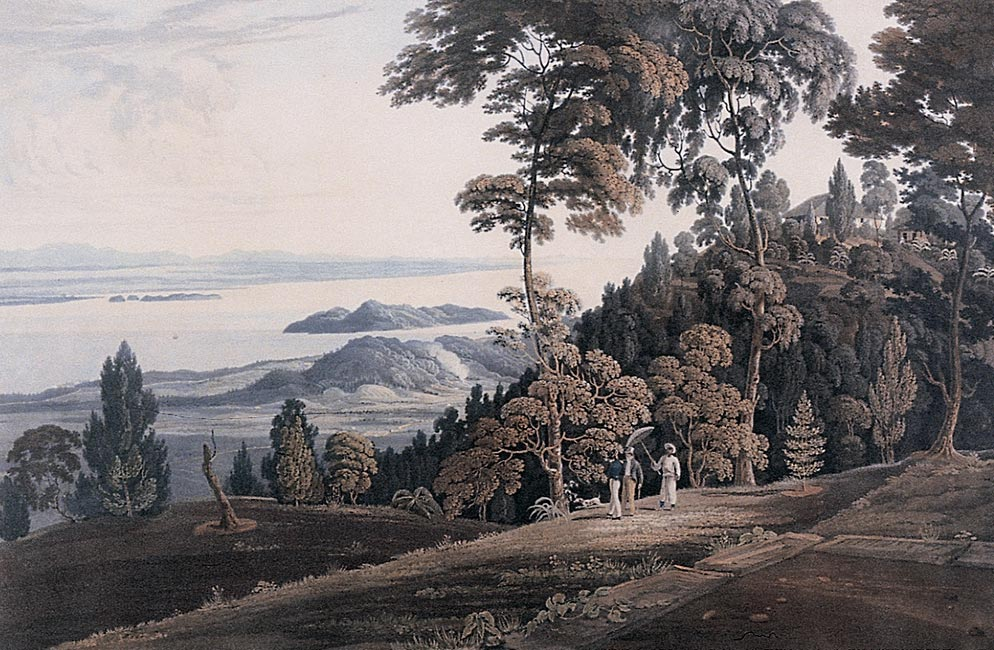
View of Jerejak island, then named Pulo Jeraja, from Penang Hill in 1817.

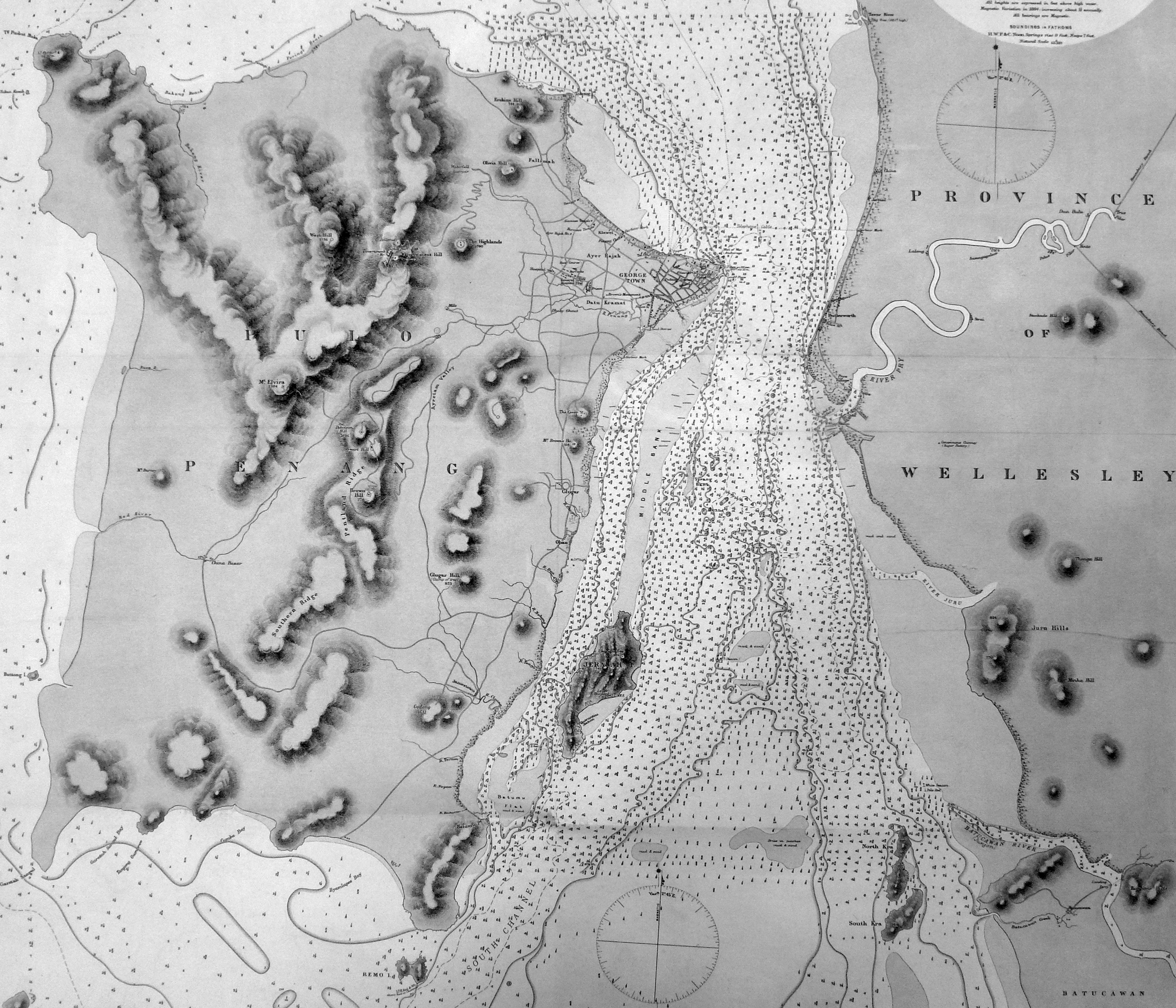
Jerejak is the heavily shaded island at the lower centre of this map of Penang in 1884.

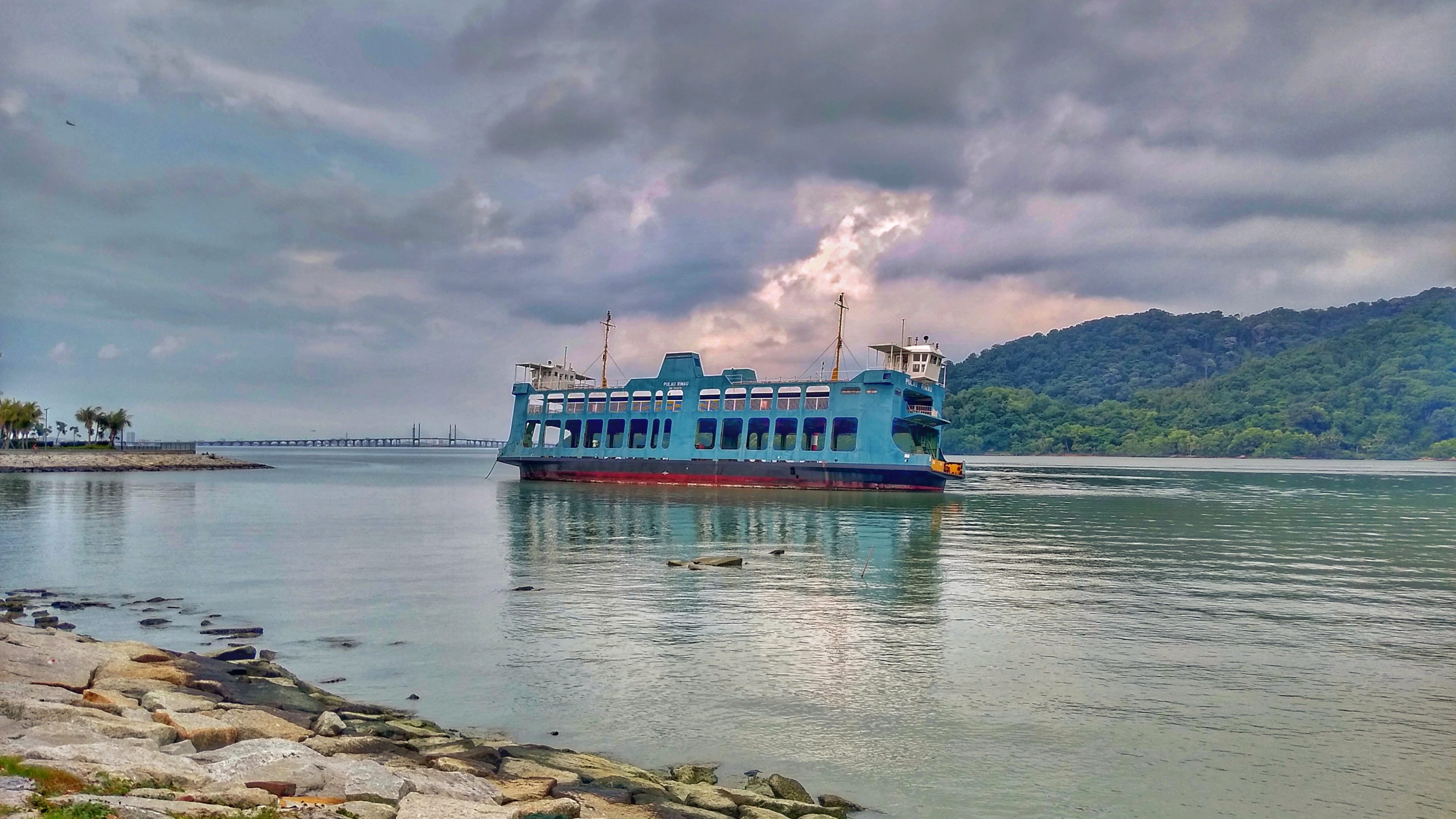
Retired ferry Pulau Rimau between Penang and Jerejak Islands, now the Marina De Captain Food Hall Floating Restaurant docked at Queens Waterfront.

Francis Light, the founder of Penang, was said to have arrived in Jerejak Island in early 1786 before heading on to Penang. In 1797, Colonel Arthur Wellesley had proposed Jerejak as the possible site for Fort Cornwallis. His idea of establishing a military post in Jerejak was to offer protection to a new township called Jamestown, which was to be set up in present-day Bayan Lepas. Earlier in 1794, there had been an outbreak of malaria caused most likely by the clearing of the jungle to establish George Town, claiming many lives, including Francis Light himself. Thus, Wellesley was not in favour of the site for Fort Cornwallis to be on Penang island.

This plan did not materialise as George Town was starting to become a profitable port and it soon became unnecessary to establish Jamestown or have a military facility in that location.

As a result of Francis Light's earlier ruling whereby immigrants were allowed to claim whatever land they could clear, Penang became flooded with immigrants. As a precautionary step, these immigrants were sent to Jerejak's health inspection centre before they were allowed to proceed to Penang.

In 1868, a leper asylum was completed and then began use in 1871. The cost of construction was supported by the local community. In 1880, it was expanded becoming the collection centre of leprosy (leprosarium) for the Straits Settlements until the 1930s. The leprosarium was closed in the 1960s and the inmates were transferred to Sungai Buloh Leper Settlement/Leprosarium. Part of the island were made into a health quarantine centre for immigrants in 1875 at the eastern and northern parts of the island.

A memorial is located at the island dedicated to two crew members of the Imperial Russian Navy who died when their cruiser Zhemchug was sunk by the cruiser SMS Emden of the Kaiserliche Marine in the Battle of Penang on 28 October 1914. This is one of the few incidences of action which took place in Malaysian territory during World War I.

After World War II, there was an increase in the number of tuberculosis patients and a sanatorium was set up at Jerejak for victims. On 12 June 1969, the Jerejak Rehabilitation Centre was set up as a maximum security prison, hence earning the island the moniker, the Alcatraz of Malaysia. The centre was eventually closed in August 1993.

== Transportation ==
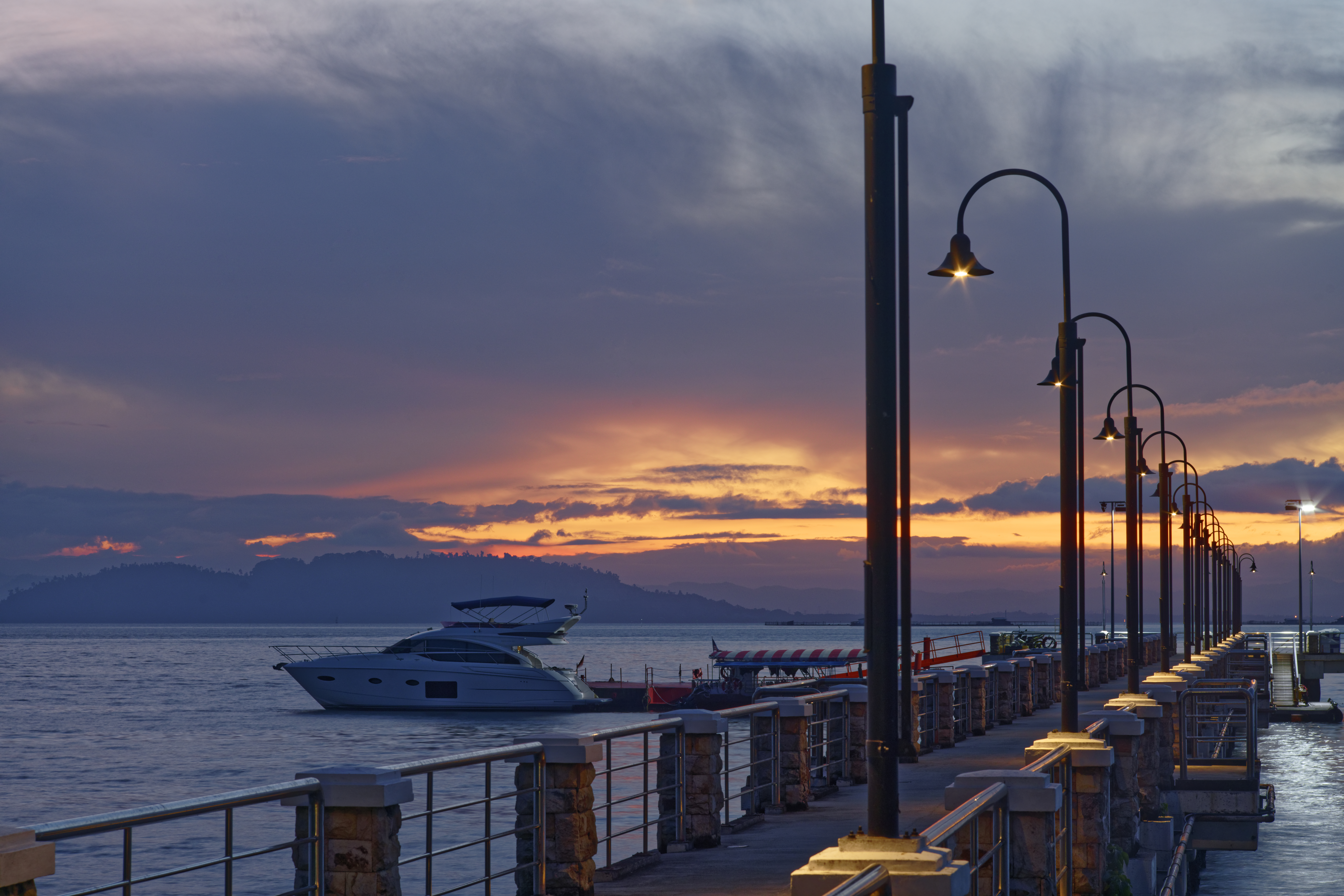
Jetty of Jerejak Island

Jerejak Island is served by a 10-minute ferry ride from the Bayan Lepas jetty.

== Current Developments ==
Plans were made to redevelop Jerejak into a resort in 2000 and this resulted in the closure of the more "unsavoury" institutions on the island like the sanatorium and prison. In January 2004, the Jerejak Resort & Spa was opened for business. The resort was built over the area once occupied by the leprosarium.

This development remains somewhat controversial, with concerns about the systematic removal of the island's historical remains and heritage and the impact on Jerejak's fragile eco-system.

== See also ==
- List of islands of Malaysia
