= Asian and Pacific theatre of World War I =

Asian and Pacific theatre
- Part of World War I
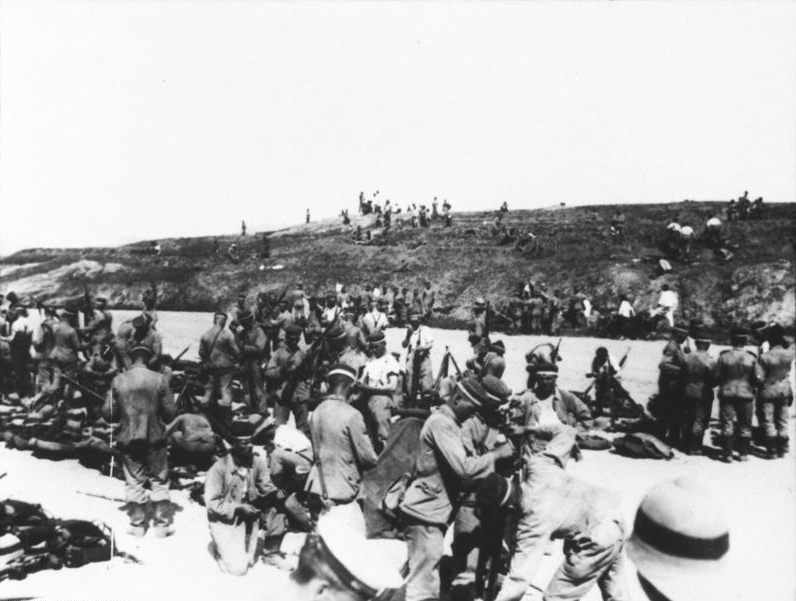
- The German front line at Qingdao
Date	3 August 1914 – 11 November 1918
Location	East Asia, Central Asia, Southeast Asia, Oceania (Melanesia, Polynesia)
Result	Allied victory

Belligerents
Allied Powers: Japan; United Kingdom; Federated Malay States; Kelantan Sultanate; Australia; New Zealand; India; France; Russia (until 1917); Khanate of Khiva; Bukhara; United States (from 1917); China (from 1917); Siam (from 1917)	Central Powers: Germany; New Guinea; Samoa; Kiautschou Territory; (German Empire) Concession of Tianjin; (German Empire) Concession in Hankou; Austria-Hungary; (Austria-Hungary) Concession of Tianjin; Ottoman Empire; Kelantan rebellion Central Asian Rebels

Commanders and leaders
(Empire of Japan) Kamio Mitsuomi; (Empire of Japan) Katō Sadakichi; (United Kingdom of Great Britain and Ireland) Christopher Cradock †; (Australia) William Holmes; (Dominion of New Zealand) Robert Logan; (French Third Republic) Félix Théroinne †; Aleksey Kuropatkin	(German Empire) Maximilian Spee †; (German Empire) Eduard Haber; (Austria-Hungary) Richárd Makovicz; Amankeldı İmanov

During World War I, conflict on the Asian continent and the islands of the Pacific included naval battles, the Allied conquest of German colonial possessions in the Pacific Ocean and China, the anti-Russian Central Asian revolt of 1916 in Russian Turkestan and the Ottoman-supported Kelantan rebellion in British Malaya. The most significant military action was the careful and well-executed Siege of Qingdao in China, but smaller actions were also fought at Bita Paka and Toma in German New Guinea.

All other German and Austro-Hungarian possessions in Asia and the Pacific fell without bloodshed. Naval warfare was common; all of the colonial powers had naval squadrons stationed in the Indian or Pacific oceans. These fleets operated by supporting the invasions of German-held territories and by destroying the East Asia Squadron of the Imperial German Navy.

== Allied offensives ==
Colonies and influence zones in Asia and the South Pacific in 1914

=== Qingdao ===
Qingdao was the most significant German base in the area. It was defended by 3,650 German troops, supported by 100 Chinese colonial troops and Austro-Hungarian soldiers and sailors defending a well-designed fort. Supporting them were a small number of vessels from the Imperial German Navy and the Austro-Hungarian Navy.

The Japanese Second Squadron consisted of 5 old battleships, 12 cruisers, 24 destroyers, 4 gunboats, 13 torpedo boats, a carrier, multiple support vessels, and 26 transports. This included 23,000 soldiers. The British sent two military units to the battle from their garrison at Tientsin, numbering 1,500, and the Chinese who were unoccupied by the Germans sent over a few thousand troops on the side of the Allies.

The bombardment of the fort started on 31 October 1914. An assault was made by the Imperial Japanese Army on the night of 6 November. The garrison surrendered the next day. Casualties of the battle were 703 on the German side and some 3,600 prisoners of war; casualties on the Allied side were 2,066. One Allied protected cruiser was also sunk by a German torpedo boat and when defeat was certain, the Germans and Austro-Hungarians scuttled their squadron.

=== Pacific ===
One of the first land offensives in the Pacific theatre was the invasion of German Samoa on 29–30 August 1914 by New Zealand forces. The campaign to take Samoa ended without bloodshed after over 1,000 New Zealanders landed on the German colony, supported by an Australian and French naval squadron.

The Australian Naval and Military Expeditionary Force (AN&MEF), hastily recruited with 1,000 infantry and 500 navy reserves as backup, was tasked with containing the Pacific German threat. After a mere two weeks of training on Palm Island, it departed by boat to Rabaul. Australian forces attacked German New Guinea in September 1914: 500 Australians encountered 300 Germans and native policemen at the Battle of Bita Paka; the Allies won and the Germans retreated to Toma. A company of Australians and a British warship besieged the Germans and their colonial subjects, ending with German Governor Eduard Haber's surrender of the entire colony.

Despite Haber's capitulation order, a variety of isolated German units in New Guinea continued to resist after the fall of Toma. These small German forces generally capitulated without bloodshed once confronted by Australian units. On 11 October 1914, the German armed yacht Komet and her 57 crew surrendered after their ship was taken by surprise and boarded at Talasea. In December 1914, a German officer near Angorum attempted to resist the Allied occupation with thirty native police but his force deserted him after they fired on an Australian scouting party and he was subsequently captured. By 1915, the only uncapitulated German force was a small expedition under the command of Hermann Detzner which managed to elude Australian patrols and hold out in the interior of the island until the end of the war, for which he became a figure of some renown.

Micronesia, the Marianas, the Carolines, and the Marshall Islands also fell to Allied forces during the war.

== German naval actions ==
Scharnhorst's and Gneisenau's path across the Pacific

=== Retreat of the German East Asia Squadron ===
==== In the Pacific ====
When war was declared on Germany in 1914, the German East Asia Squadron withdrew from its base at Qingdao and attempted to make its way east across the Pacific and back to Germany. After concentrating the majority of its force at Pagan Island, the fleet raided several Allied targets as it made its way across the Pacific.

Detached cruisers raided the cable station at Fanning and then rejoined with the squadron. Later the German forces would attack Papeete where Admiral Maximilian von Spee with his two armoured cruisers sank a French gunboat and a freighter before bombarding Papeete's shore batteries.

==== Chile and the Falklands ====
The next engagement was fought off Chile at the Battle of Coronel on 1 November 1914, Admiral Spee commanding the armoured cruisers SMS Gneisenau and SMS Scharnhorst and three light cruisers SMS Emden, SMS Nürnberg, and SMS Leipzig won the battle by defeating a British squadron against recently appointed Rear Admirable Christopher Cradock armed with his flagship, HMS Good Hope, and generally inferior ships compared to the German ships which was sent to destroy him, armed with his flagship, HMS Glasgow, HMS Monmouth, and HMS Otranto. Admiral Spee's two armoured and three light cruisers sank two Royal Navy armoured cruisers and forced a British light cruiser and auxiliary cruiser to flee losing both the Good Hope and Monmouth. Over 1,500 British sailors (all hands aboard both cruisers) were killed while only three Germans were wounded. The victory did not last long as the German fleet was soon defeated in Atlantic waters at the Battle of the Falklands in December 1914. Spee himself went down with his own flagship Scharnhorst.

The only German vessels to escape the Falklands engagement was the light cruiser SMS Dresden and the auxiliary Seydlitz. Seydlitz fled into the Atlantic before being interned by neutral Argentina, while Dresden turned about and steamed back into the Pacific. The Dresden then attempted to act as a commerce raider, without much success, until March 1915 when its engines began to break down. Without means of getting repairs, the German light cruiser sailed into neutral Chilean waters at the island of Mas a Tierra where it was cornered by British naval forces. After a short battle in which four of her crew were killed, the Dresden was forced to scuttle and her crew was interned by Chilean authorities.

=== SMS Emden in the Indian Ocean ===
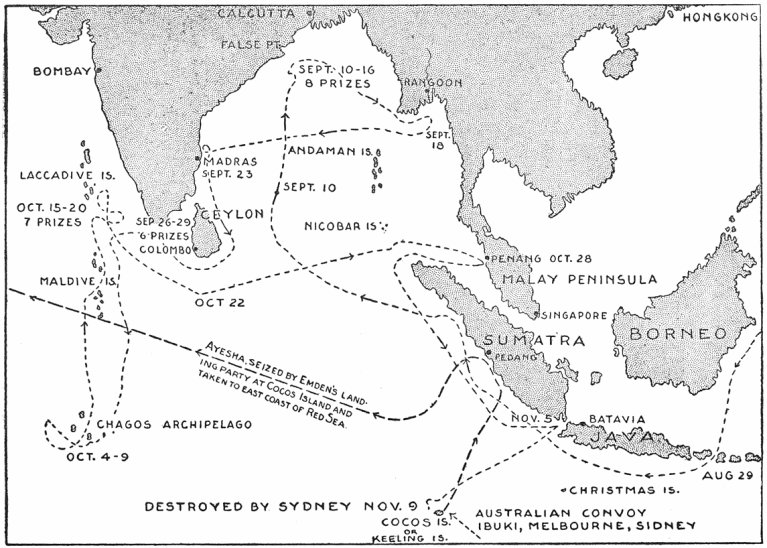
The cruise of the Emden

SMS Emden was left behind by Admiral Graf Maximilian von Spee when he began his retreat across the Pacific. The ship won the Battle of Penang, in which the Germans sank a Russian cruiser and a French destroyer. Emden also harried merchant vessels of the Allies and destroyed over thirty of them. She went on and bombarded Madras, India, causing damage to British oil tanks and sinking an Allied merchant ship. The attack caused widespread panic in the city and thousands of people fled from the coast, fearing that the Germans may have begun an invasion of India as a whole.

After a very successful career as a merchant raider, Emden was engaged by HMAS Sydney at the Battle of Cocos, where the German vessel was destroyed. A group of sailors under the command of Hellmuth von Mücke managed to escape towards the Arabian peninsula which was then part of the Ottoman Empire, an ally of the German Empire during World War I.

=== The cruise of SMS Seeadler ===
SMS Seeadler, an auxiliary cruiser windjammer and merchant raider, commanded by Felix von Luckner managed successful attacks on Allied shipping in both the Atlantic and Pacific Oceans. During her career she captured sixteen vessels and sank most of them.

In August 1917 Seeadler was wrecked at the island of Mopelia in French Polynesia so the Germans established a small colony on the island which housed them and several Allied prisoners, most of whom were American. Eventually when starvation proved to be an urgent concern, Luckner and his crew left the prisoners on the uninhabited island, from which they were eventually rescued, and set sail in a lifeboat for Fiji. There, on 5 September, Luckner captured a French schooner named Lutece and renamed her Fortuna.

After that they headed for Easter Island and again their ship was wrecked when it grounded on a reef. Subsequently, the Germans were interned by the Chileans on 5 October 1917, which ended the journey. During the entire cruise only one man perished, due to an accident.

=== The scuttling of SMS Cormoran at Guam ===
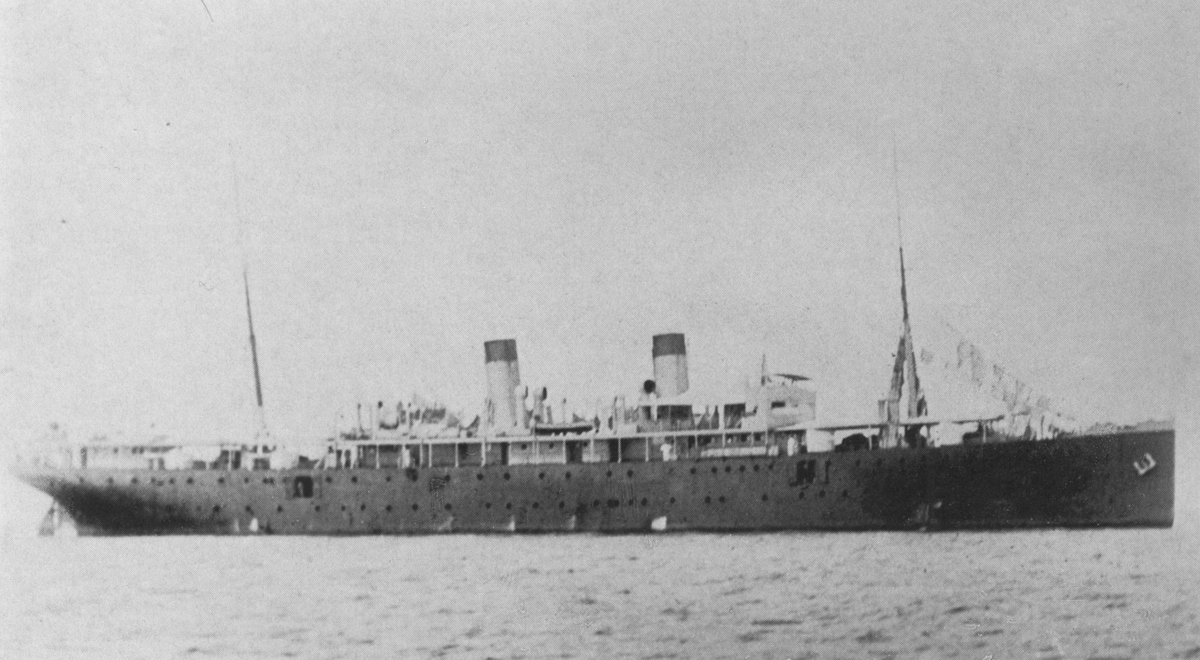
SMS Cormoran

The United States was involved in at least one hostile encounter with Germans in the Pacific during World War I. On 7 April 1917, SMS Cormoran was scuttled in Apra Harbor, Guam to prevent her capture by the auxiliary cruiser USS Supply. The Americans fired their first shots of the war at the Germans as they attempted to sink the ship. Ultimately the Germans succeeded in scuttling the Cormoran with a loss of nine men dead.

== Russia ==
In June 1916, Tsar Nicholas II adopted a draft of conscripting Central Asian men from the age of 19 to 43 into labor battalions for the service in support of the ongoing Brusilov Offensive. As a result, a revolt broke out on 3 July among the Muslim inhabitants of Russian Turkestan against the Russian authorities. Russia was forced to divert several thousand soldiers from the Eastern Front to suppress the rebellion, which ended in February 1917. Suppression of the rebels was typified by general massacres against the local population. This was followed by the expulsion of the surviving Kyrgyz and Kazakh from Russian Turkestan toward China; many of the refugees died along the way while attempting to cross the Tian Shan mountains. The revolt resulted in around 100,000 to 270,000 dead among the Kyrgyz population.

== China ==
The German government was accused of being behind Zhang Xun's monarchist coup in China to prevent Duan Qirui's pro-war faction from supporting the Allies. After the coup failed in July 1917, Duan used the incident as a pretext for declaring war on Germany. The German and Austro-Hungarian concessions in Tientsin and Hankow were occupied and their nationals detained. China also supplied civilian laborers to the Allies for mainly non-combat and auxiliary roles on the Western Front.

== Siam ==
On 22 July 1917, Siam declared war on Germany and Austria-Hungary. Twelve German vessels docked in Siamese ports were immediately seized. The crews and other Central Power nationals were detained and sent to India to join their fellow citizens in British India's existing civilian internment camps. Being the only Southeast Asian country to maintain independence throughout the colonial period, Siam was the only state in the region to enter the conflict entirely of its own free will, as an equal of the European powers rather than as part of their imperial contingents. The Siamese and the Vietnamese were also the only two Southeast Asian nations to fight in the war. Siam sent an Expeditionary Forces to mainland Europe, and participate in the Paris Peace Conference to become a founding member of the League of Nations, overall increasing its international standing and modernizing both their army and its understanding of war in the modern age.

== Gallery ==
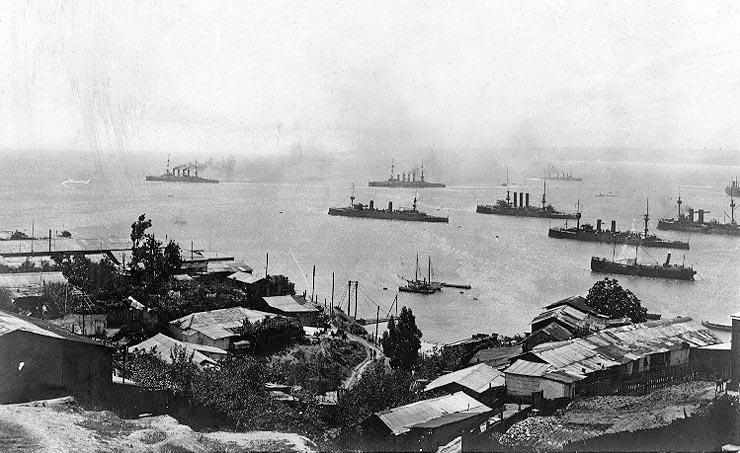
The German fleet off Chile in November 1914 after the Battle of Coronel

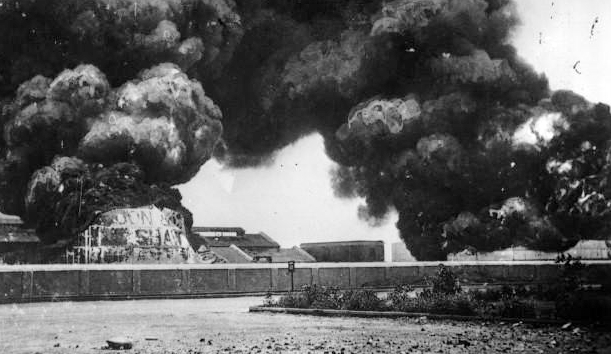
Madras oil tanks on fire after being bombarded by SMS Emden

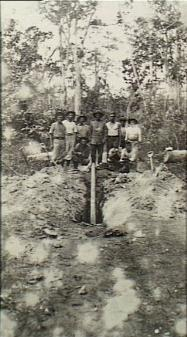
Australian troops after digging up a German land mine along Bita Paka Road during the New Guinea Campaign

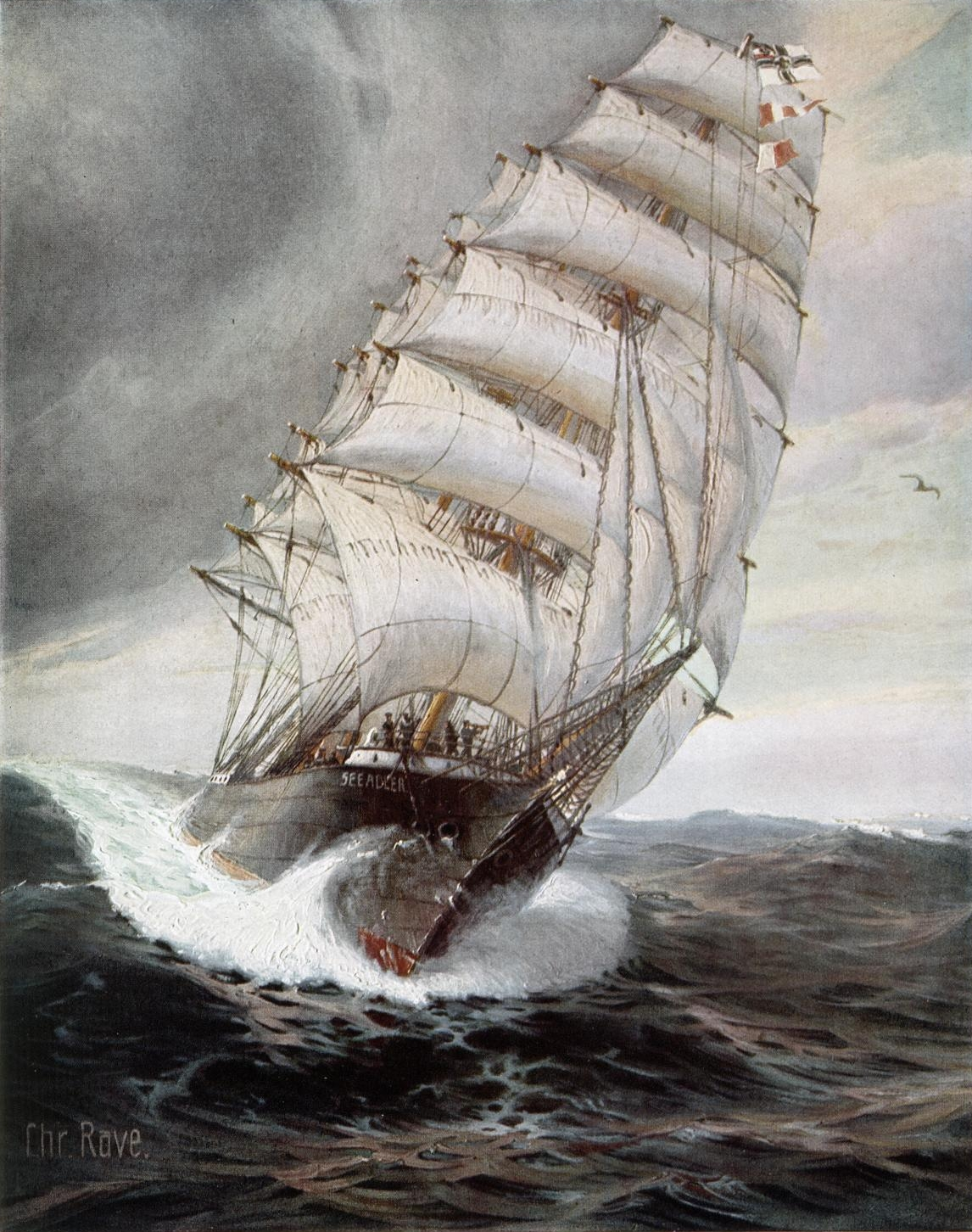
The German auxiliary cruiser SMS Seeadler

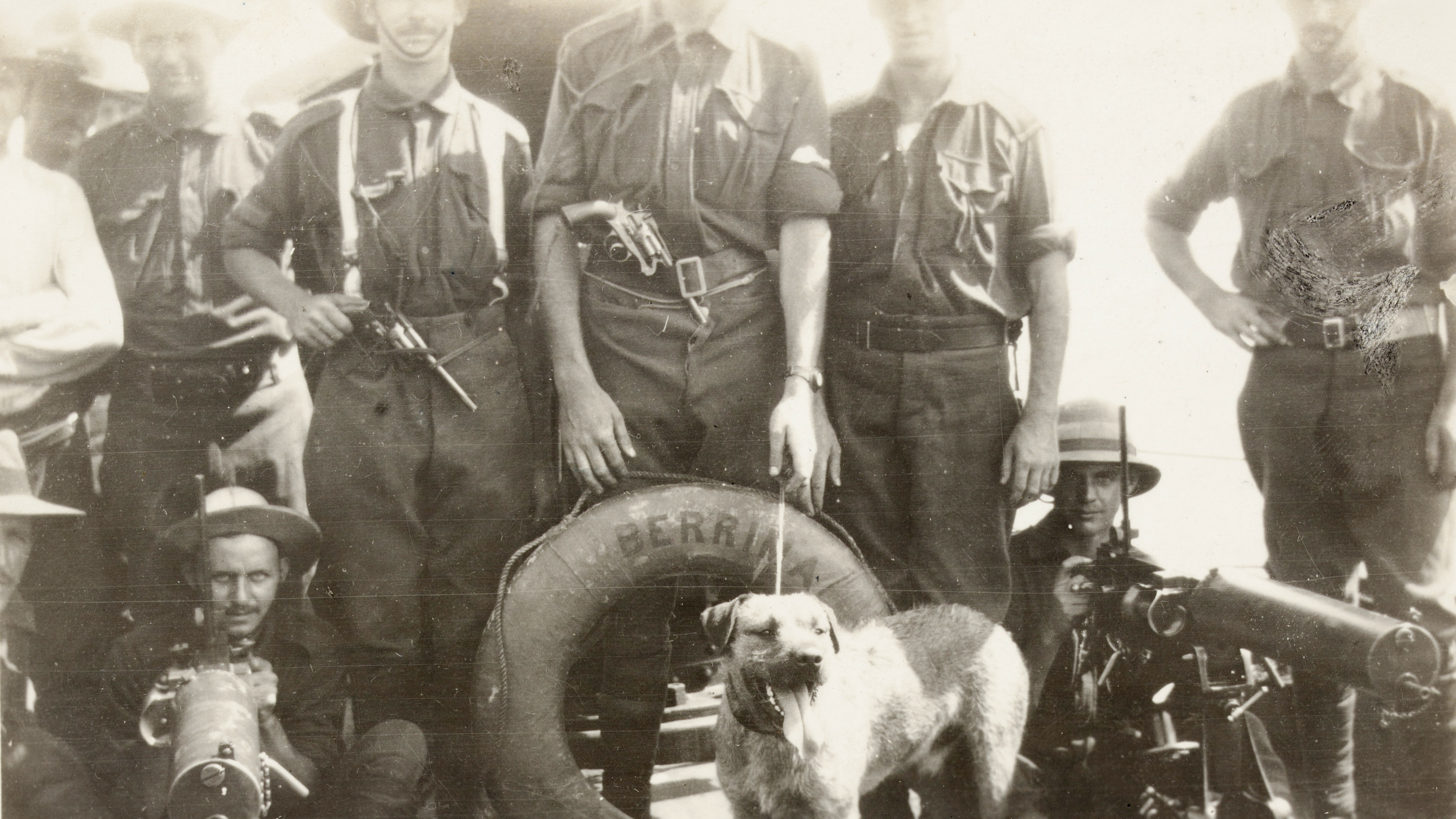
Machine gunners and soldiers of the first Australian Expeditionary Force, on board the troopship Berrima, 1914

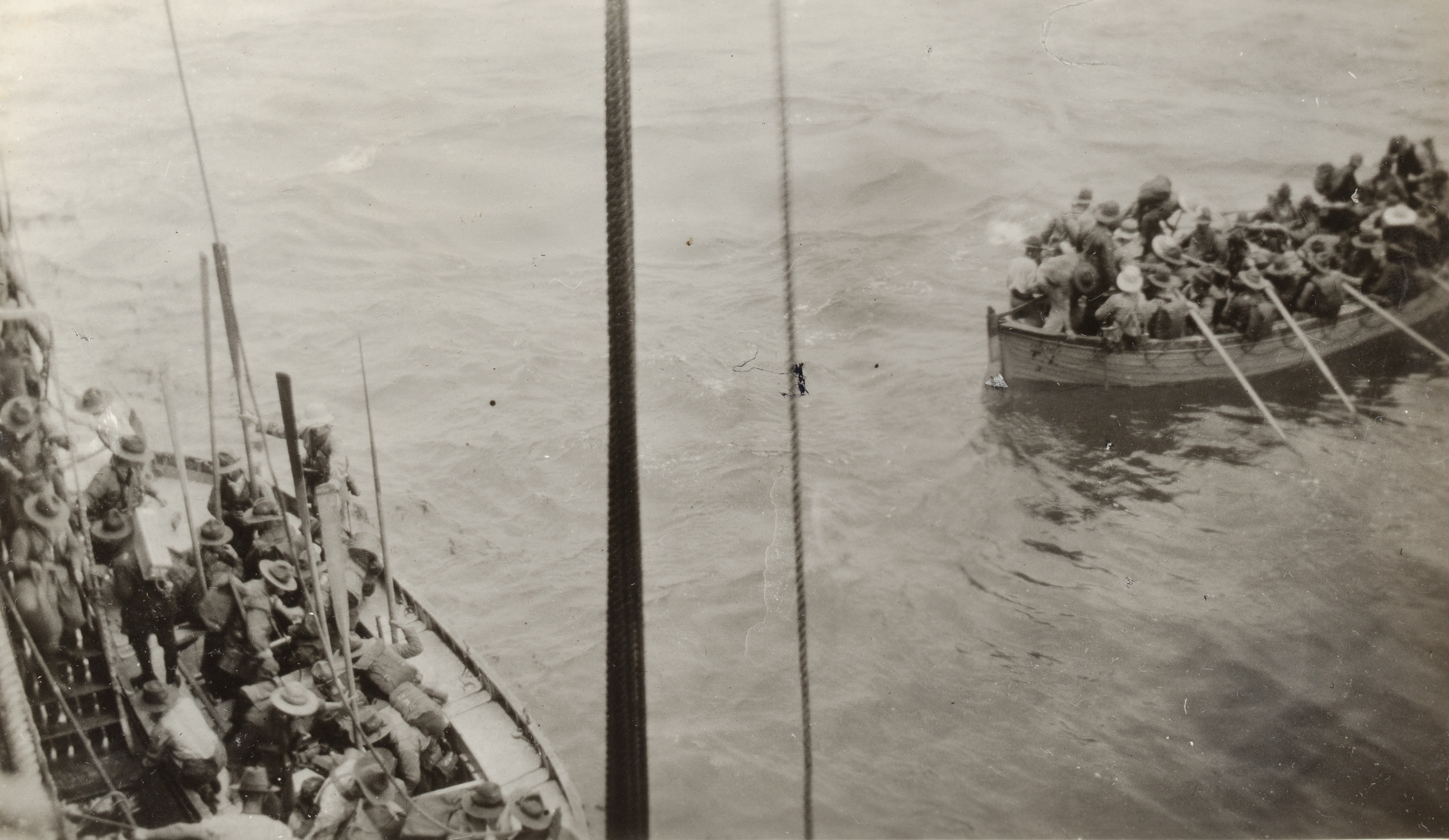
Troops landing at Herbertshöhe, New Guinea, 1914, by F. S. Burnell

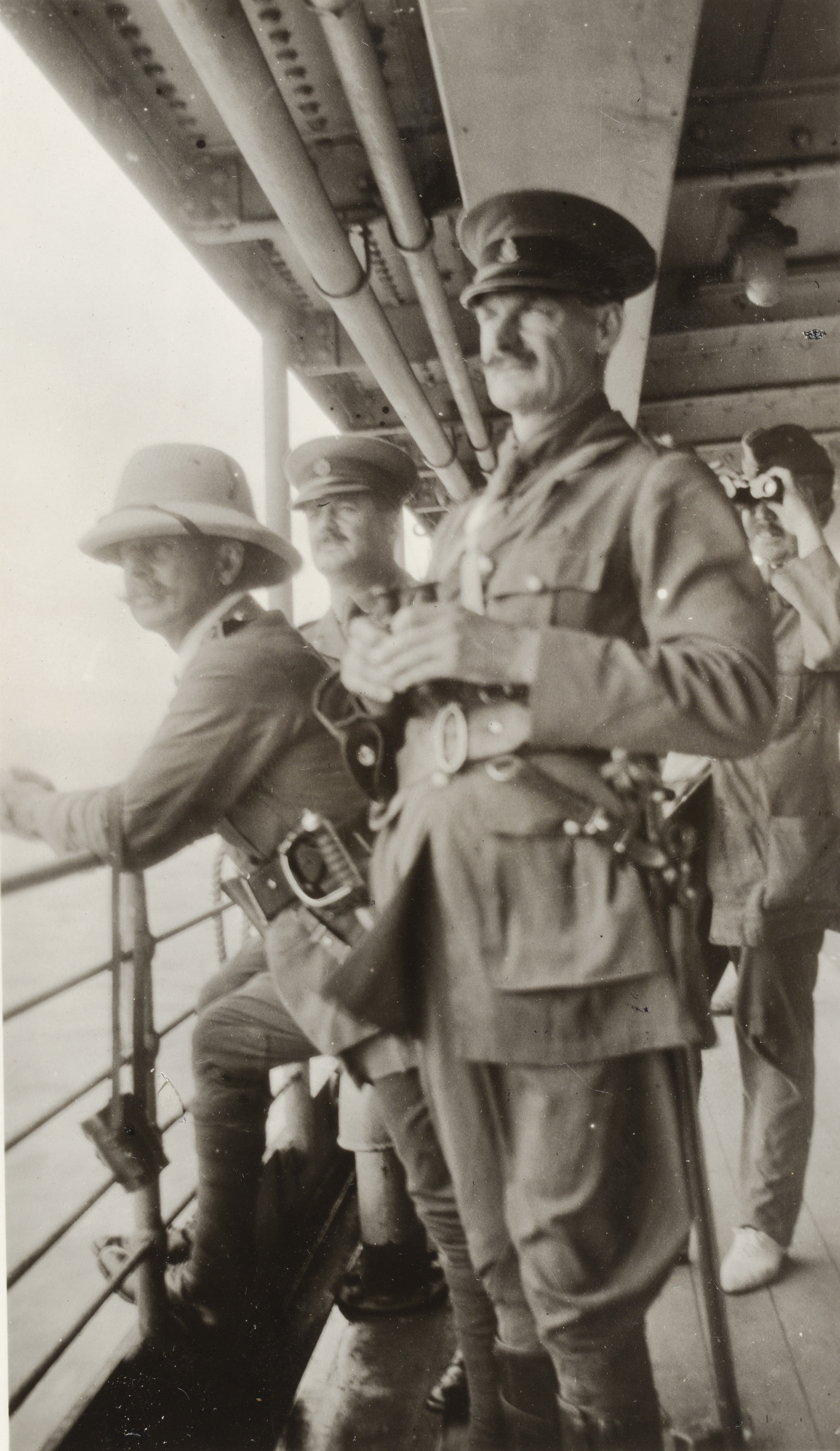
Colonel Holmes (Brigadier), Colonel Watson (O.C. Infantry), and Colonel Paton, with Captain Goodsall scanning the hills for wireless station at Bita Paka, 1914, F. S. Burnell

== See also ==
- Samoa Expeditionary Force
- Australian Naval and Military Expeditionary Force
- Hindu–German Conspiracy
- Imperial Japanese Navy in World War I
- SMS Geier
