= French destroyer Mousquet =

Arquebuse-class destroyer

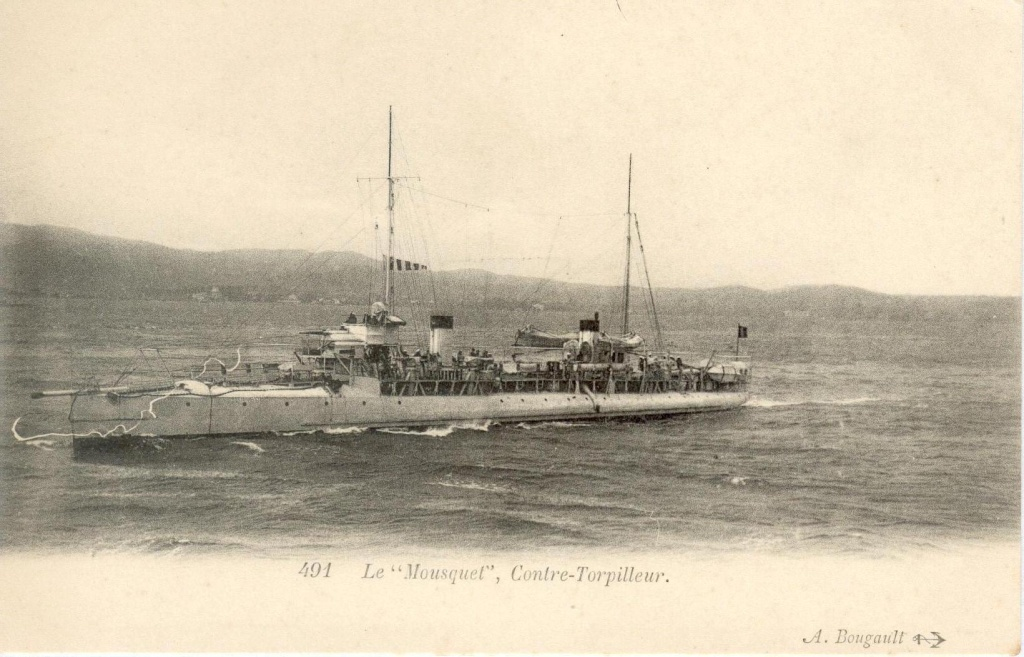
- A postcard of Mousquet underway

History

France
- Name: Mousquet
- Namesake: Musket
- Ordered: 14 November 1900
- Builder: Ateliers et Chantiers de la Loire, Nantes
- Laid down: November 1900
- Launched: 7 August 1902
- Commissioned: June 1903
- Fate: Sunk by SMS Emden during the Battle of Penang, 28 October 1914

General characteristics
- Class & type: Arquebuse-class destroyer
- Displacement: 357 t (351 long tons) (deep load)
- Length: 56.58 m (185 ft 8 in) (o/a)
- Beam: 6.38 m (20 ft 11 in)
- Draft: 3.2 m (10 ft 6 in) (deep load)
- Installed power: 2 water-tube boilers; 6,300 ihp (4,698 kW)
- Propulsion: 2 shafts; 2 triple-expansion steam engines
- Speed: 28 knots (52 km/h; 32 mph)
- Range: 2,300 nmi (4,300 km; 2,600 mi) at 10 knots (19 km/h; 12 mph)
- Complement: 4 officers and 58 enlisted men
- Armament: 1 × single 65 mm (2.6 in) gun; 6 × single 47 mm (1.9 in) guns; 2 × single 381 mm (15 in) torpedo tubes

Mousquet was an Arquebuse-class destroyer built for the French Navy in the first decade of the 20th century. Completed in 1903, the ship was initially assigned to the Mediterranean Squadron, but was transferred to the Far East the following year. She was sunk by the Imperial German Navy cruiser SMS Emden during the Battle of Penang in 1914, a few months after the beginning of World War I.

== Design and description ==
The Arquebuse class was designed as a faster version of the preceding Durandal class. The ships had an overall length of 56.58 meters (185 ft 8 in), a beam of 6.38 meters (20 ft 11 in), and a maximum draft of 3.2 meters (10 ft 6 in). They normally displaced 307 metric tons (302 long tons) and 357 t (351 long tons) at deep load. The two vertical triple-expansion steam engines each drove one propeller shaft using steam provided by two du Temple Guyot or Normand boilers. The engines were designed to produce a total of 6,300 indicated horsepower (4,700 kW) for a design speed of 28 knots (52 km/h; 32 mph), all the ships exceeded their contracted speed during their sea trials. They carried enough coal to give them a range of 2,300 nautical miles (4,300 km; 2,600 mi) at 10 knots (19 km/h; 12 mph). Their crew consisted of four officers and fifty-eight enlisted men.

The main armament of the Arquebuse-class ships consisted of a single 65-millimeter (2.6 in) gun forward of the bridge and six 47-millimeter (1.9 in) Hotchkiss guns in single mounts, three on each broadside. They were fitted with two single rotating mounts for 381-millimeter (15 in) torpedo tubes on the centerline, one between the funnels and the other on the stern.

== Construction and career ==
Mousquet (Musket) was ordered from Ateliers et Chantiers de la Loire on 14 November 1900 and the ship was laid down in November at the company's shipyard in Nantes. She was launched on 7 August 1902 and conducted her sea trials during February–May 1903. The ship was commissioned after her completion and was assigned to the Mediterranean Fleet (Escadre de la Méditerranée). Mousquet and her sister ship Fronde were used to conduct the navy's first trials with wireless telegraphy. The destroyers and their sister Pistolet were transferred to the Far East Squadron (escadre de l'Extrême-Orient) based in French Indochina in April 1904; they traveled there in company with the protected cruiser D'Assas.

In March 1907, the three destroyers were assigned to the newly formed 1st China Sea Torpedo Boat Flotilla (1^{re} Flotille des torpilleurs des mers de Chine) of the Far East Squadron. As of 1911, the renamed Naval Division of the Far East (Division navale de l'Extrême-Orient) consisted of the armored cruisers Dupleix and Kléber, the old torpedo cruiser D'Iberville, Mousquet and two other destroyers, six torpedo boats, and four submarines, along with a number of smaller vessels. In July of that year, Mousquet was placed in reserve at Saigon, where she remained laid up until early 1914. She was recommissioned on 5 March to relieve Fronde and was still on active service when World War I began in July 1914.

=== World War I ===
At the start of World War I in August 1914, the Naval Division of the Far East included Mousquet, along with the armored cruisers Montcalm and Dupleix, D'Iberville, and the destroyers Pistolet and Fronde. The unit was based in Saigon in French Indochina. The destroyers and D'Iberville were initially sent to patrol the Strait of Malacca while the armored cruisers were sent north to join the search for the German East Asia Squadron. D'Iberville and the destroyers conducted patrols in the strait for the German unprotected cruiser SMS Geier, which was known to be passing through the area at the time; the French ships failed to locate the German vessel.

In the early hours of 28 October, the German light cruiser SMS Emden raided Triple Entente warships in the Battle of Penang. Mousquet was approaching the harbor at George Town, Penang, when Emden fled, having torpedoed and sunk the Russian protected cruiser Zhemchug. Mousquet turned away from Emden when the latter opened fire, but the German vessel quickly found the range and scored at least one hit that damaged Mousquet's propulsion system. Mousquet returned fire with one of her guns and launched a torpedo, but both missed. The damage from Emden's shell quickly proved to be fatal, and once it became apparent that she was sinking by the bow, the Germans ceased firing and came close by to pick up survivors. Emden lowered a pair of cutters and rescued an officer and 35 men. Another 42 of her crew, including her captain, were killed in the sinking. Two days later, Emden stopped the British steamer SS Newburn and transferred the survivors to her.

The wreck was deemed at hazard to navigation in 1969 and was scrapped in place. The remains of the sailors locked in the wreck were handed over to France by the Malaysian government on 20 October 1970 and transferred to New Caledonia. They now rest in a tomb in the naval base at Nouméa.

== Bibliography ==
- Burgoyne, Alan H., ed. (1911). "The French Navy". The Navy League Annual. V. London: John Murray: 57–66. OCLC 809125514.
- Campbell, N. J. M. (1979). "France". In Chesneau, Roger & Kolesnik, Eugene M. (eds.). Conway's All the World's Fighting Ships 1860–1905. Greenwich, UK: Conway Maritime Press. pp. 283–333. ISBN 0-8317-0302-4.
- Corbett, Julian Stafford (1920). Naval Operations: To The Battle of the Falklands, December 1914. Vol. I. London: Longmans, Green & Co. OCLC 174823980.
- Couhat, Jean Labayle (1974). French Warships of World War I. London: Ian Allan. ISBN 0-7110-0445-5.
- Jordan, John & Caresse, Philippe (2019). French Armoured Cruisers 1887–1932. Barnsley, UK: Seaforth Publishing. ISBN 978-1-5267-4118-9.
- Le Masson, Henri (1967). Histoire du Torpilleur en France [History of the Torpedo-armed Ship in France]. Paris: Académie de marine. OCLC 491016784.
- Prévoteaux, Gérard (2017). La marine française dans la Grande guerre: les combattants oubliés: Tome I 1914–1915 [The French Navy during the Great War: The Forgotten Combatants, Book I 1914–1915]. Collection Navires & Histoire des Marines du Mond. Vol. 23. Le Vigen, France: Éditions Lela presse. ISBN 978-2-37468-000-2.
- Putz, Hubert (October 2020). "Memorial: Le lieutenant de vaisseau Félix Thérorinne" [Memorial for Lieutenant Félix Thérorinne]. La Baille: Revue de l'Association des anciens élèves de l'École navale (in French) (349). ISSN 1281-1807.
- Roberts, Stephen S. (2021). French Warships in the Age of Steam 1859–1914: Design, Construction, Careers and Fates. Barnsley, UK: Seaforth Publishing. ISBN 978-1-5267-4533-0.
- Staff, Gary (2011). Battle on the Seven Seas. Barnsley, UK: Pen & Sword Maritime. ISBN 978-1-84884-182-6.
- Stanglini, Ruggero & Cosentino, Michelle (2022). The French Fleet: Ships, Strategy and Operations, 1870-1918. Barnsley, UK: Seaforth Publishing. ISBN 978-1-5267-0131-2.
