= French destroyer Fronde =

French naval ship from 1903 to 1919

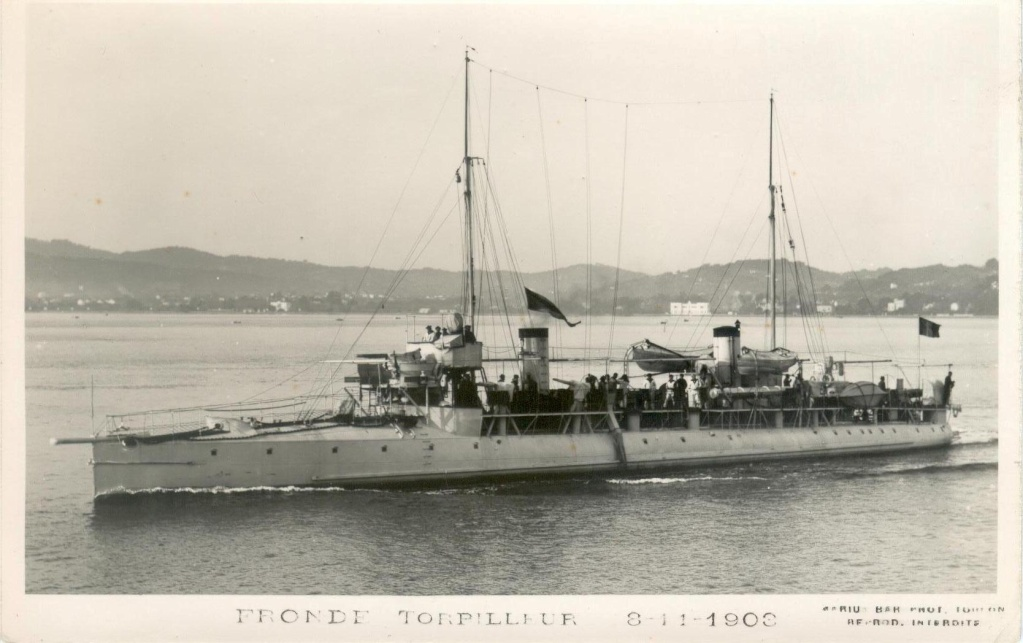
- Fronde underway in harbor

History

France
- Name: Fronde
- Namesake: Sling
- Ordered: 14 November 1900
- Builder: Chantiers et Ateliers de la Gironde, Bordeaux-Lormont
- Laid down: January 1901
- Launched: 17 December 1902
- Commissioned: April 1903
- Stricken: 30 October 1919
- Fate: Sold for scrap, 6 May 1920

General characteristics
- Class & type: Arquebuse-class destroyer
- Displacement: 357 t (351 long tons) (deep load)
- Length: 56.58 m (185 ft 8 in) (o/a)
- Beam: 6.38 m (20 ft 11 in)
- Draft: 3.2 m (10 ft 6 in) (deep load)
- Installed power: 2 water-tube boilers; 6,300 ihp (4,698 kW)
- Propulsion: 2 shafts; 2 triple-expansion steam engines
- Speed: 28 knots (52 km/h; 32 mph)
- Range: 2,300 nmi (4,300 km; 2,600 mi) at 10 knots (19 km/h; 12 mph)
- Complement: 4 officers and 58 enlisted men
- Armament: 1 × single 65 mm (2.6 in) gun; 6 × single 47 mm (1.9 in) guns; 2 × single 381 mm (15 in) torpedo tubes

Fronde was a Arquebuse-class destroyer contre-torpilleur d'escadre built for the French Navy in the first decade of the 20th century. Completed in 1903, the ship was initially assigned to the Mediterranean Squadron (Escadre de la Méditerranée), but was transferred to the Far East the following year. The ship was wrecked during a typhoon in 1906, but was salvaged and returned to service. She participated in the Battle of Penang in 1914, a few months after the beginning of the World War I. Fronde was transferred to the Mediterranean in 1915 and remained there for the war. The ship was sold for scrap in 1920.

== Design and description ==
The Arquebuse class was designed as a faster version of the preceding Durandal class. The ships had an overall length of 56.58 meters (185 ft 8 in), a beam of 6.3 meters (20 ft 8 in), and a maximum draft of 3.2 meters (10 ft 6 in). They normally displaced 307 metric tons (302 long tons) and 357 t (351 long tons) at deep load. The two vertical triple-expansion steam engines each drove one propeller shaft using steam provided by two du Temple Guyot or Normand boilers. The engines were designed to produce a total of 6,300 indicated horsepower (4,700 kW) for a designed speed of 28 knots (52 km/h; 32 mph), all the ships exceeded their contracted speed during their sea trials with Fronde reaching a speed of 30.7 knots (56.9 km/h; 35.3 mph). They carried enough coal to give them a range of 2,300 nautical miles (4,300 km; 2,600 mi) at 10 knots (19 km/h; 12 mph). Their crew consisted of four officers and fifty-eight enlisted men.

The main armament of the Arquebuse-class ships consisted of a single 65-millimeter (2.6 in) gun forward of the bridge and six 47-millimeter (1.9 in) Hotchkiss guns in single mounts, three on each broadside. They were fitted with two single rotating mounts for 381-millimeter (15 in) torpedo tubes on the centerline, one between the funnels and the other on the stern.

== Construction and career ==
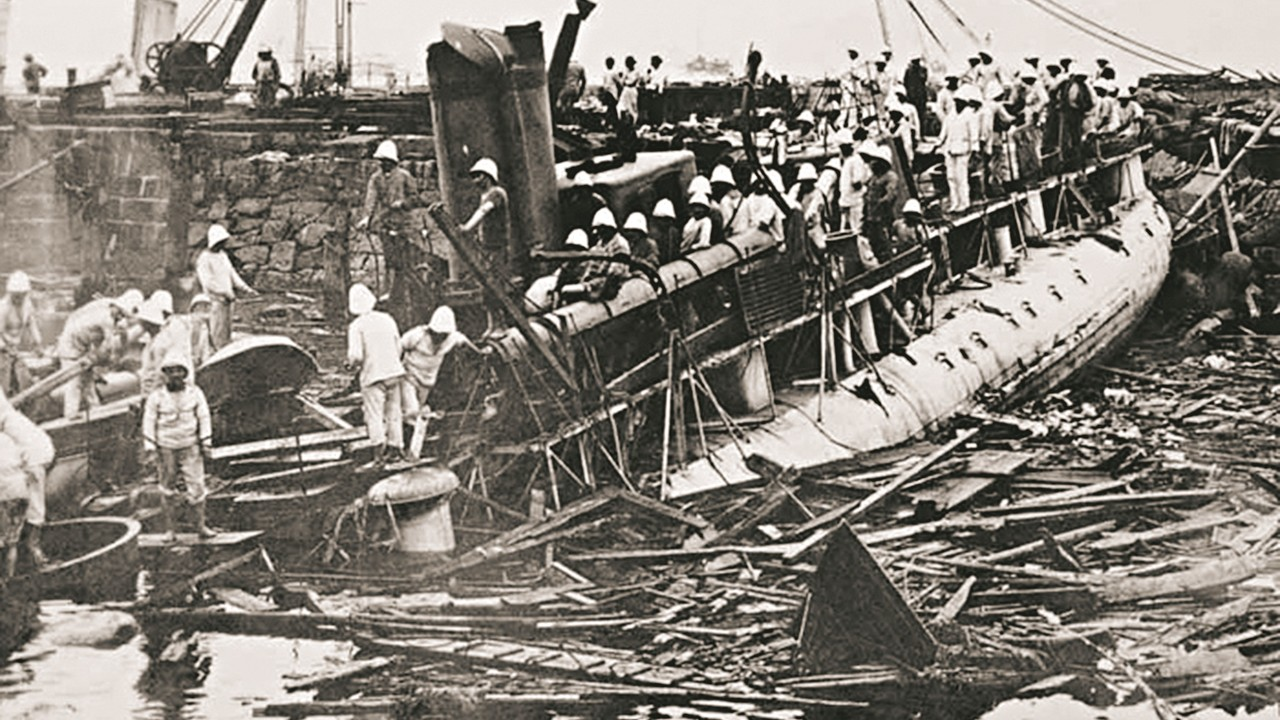
Wreck of the Fronde in Hong Kong

Fronde (French for "sling") was ordered from Chantiers et Ateliers de la Gironde on 14 November 1900 and the ship was laid down in January 1901 at its shipyard in Bordeaux-Lormont. She was launched on 17 December 1902 and conducted her sea trials during January-March 1903. The ship was commissioned (armement définitif) in April and was assigned to the Mediterranean Fleet. Fronde and her sister ship Mousquet were used to conduct the navy's first trials with wireless telegraphy. The two destroyers and their sister Pistolet were transferred to the Far East Squadron (Escadre de l'Extrême-Orient) based in French Indochina in April 1904. They sailed in company with the protected cruiser D'Assas.

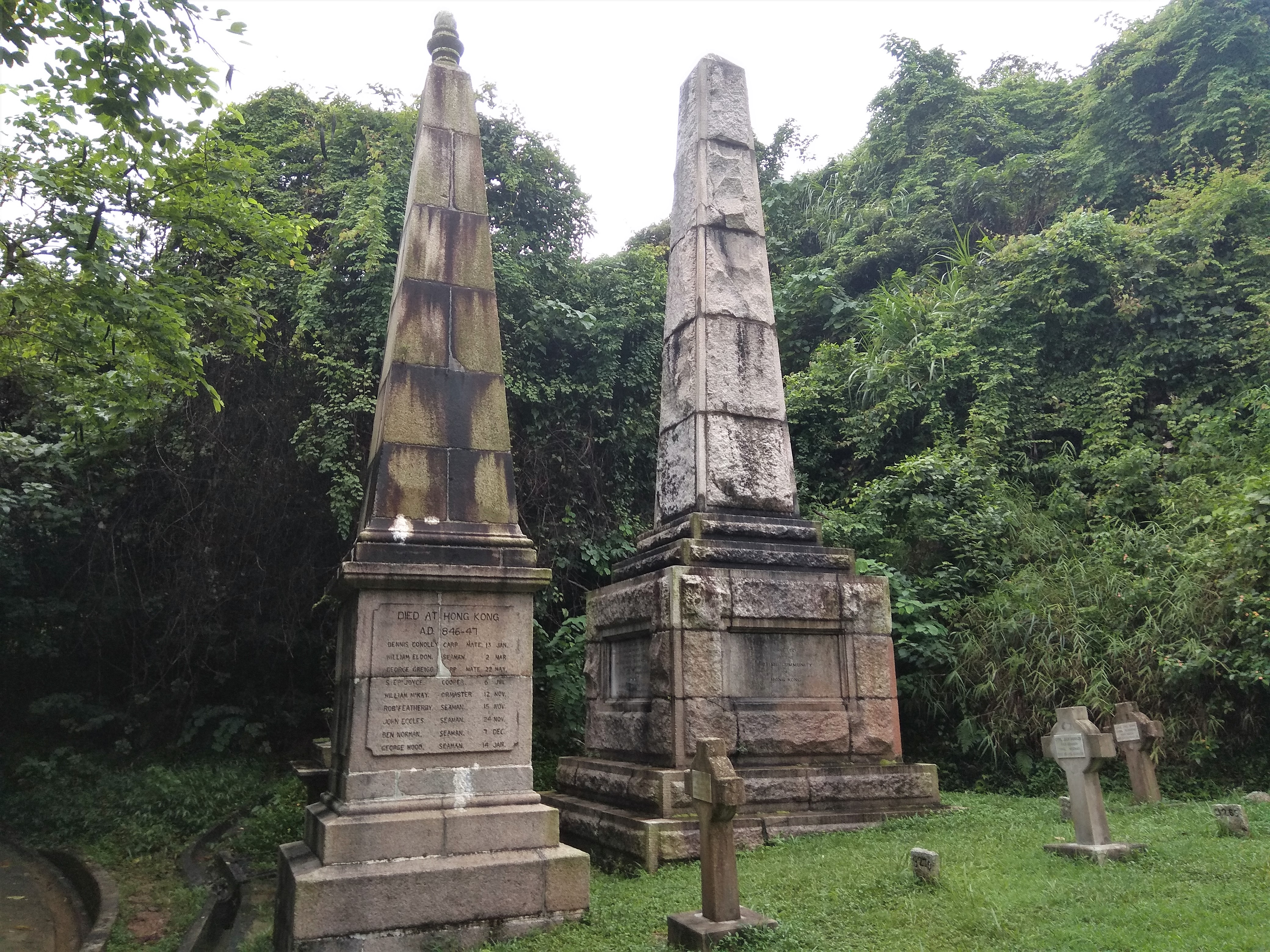
Fronde Memorial (right) in Hong Kong Cemetery. The obelisk on the left is the HMS Vestal Memorial, commemorating officers and crew of HMS Vestal who died between 1844 and 1847.

Fronde was wrecked in the 1906 typhoon that hit Hong Kong; the storm rolled the ship onto the beach, and five of her crew were killed in the accident. The ship was raised and then dry docked in Kowloon to be repaired by the Hong Kong Dock Company. The Fronde Memorial, a granite obelisk, was erected in May 1908 in memory of the five sailors of the Fronde who disappeared in the sinking of their boat near the Torpedo Depot, in Kowloon. Initially erected at the corner of Gascoigne Road and Jordan Road, the monument was later relocated to Hong Kong Cemetery in Happy Valley.

In March 1907, the three destroyers were assigned to the newly formed 1st China Sea Torpedo Boat Flotilla (1^{re} Flotille des torpilleurs des mers de Chine) of the Far East Squadron. As of 1911, the renamed Naval Division of the Far East (Division navale de l'Extrême-Orient) consisted of the armored cruisers Dupleix and Kléber, the old torpedo cruiser D'Iberville, Fronde and two other destroyers, six torpedo boats, and four submarines, along with a number of smaller vessels. Fronde was reduced to reserve in March 1914.

=== World War I ===
At the start of World War I in August 1914, the Naval Division of the Far East included Fronde, Pistolet and Mousquet, and the armored cruisers Montcalm and Dupleix, along with D'Iberville. The unit was based in Saigon in French Indochina. The destroyers and D'Iberville were initially sent to patrol the Strait of Malacca while the armored cruisers were sent north to join the search for the German East Asia Squadron. D'Iberville and the destroyers conducted patrols in the strait, searching for the German unprotected cruiser SMS Geier, which was known to be passing through the area at the time; the French ships failed to locate the German vessel.

Fronde was present in the harbor at Penang, a British Crown colony, on 27 October 1914, moored alongside her sister Pistolet. The other major Triple Entente ships in the harbor included D'Iberville and the Russian protected cruiser Zhemchug. In the early hours of 28 October, the German light cruiser SMS Emden entered the harbor to attack the Entente vessels there. In the ensuing Battle of Penang, Emden quickly torpedoed and sank Zhemchug. As Emden turned to leave the harbor, Fronde and D'Iberville opened fire, but their gun crews fired wildly and failed to score any hits on the German raider. The German vessel then encountered Fronde's sister Mousquet, which was returning to Penang when the attack began. Emden quickly sank Mousquet and stopped to pick up survivors, but in the meantime, Fronde had gotten underway and attempted to close with Emden. The Germans fled, pursued by Fronde, for about two hours before Emden was able to disappear into a rain squall.

In March 1915, Fronde was fully reactivated and returned to France where she served in the Mediterranean for the rest of the war. The ship rescued 45 survivors from the Greek destroyer Doxa after it had been torpedoed and sunk by a German submarine in the Straits of Messina on 27 June 1917. She was one of five destroyers that escorted the predreadnought battleship Charlemagne from Bizerte, French Tunisia, to Toulon in September 1917. By 1918 the ship had been assigned to the 8th Destroyer Flotilla (8^{me} Flotille de contre-torpilleurs). On 3 July, Fronde collided with the submarine chaser C.43, resulting in the loss of the latter vessel. She was struck from the naval register on 30 October 1919 and sold for scrap in Toulon on 6 May 1920.

== Bibliography ==
- Burgoyne, Alan H., ed. (1911). "The French Navy". The Navy League Annual. V. London: John Murray: 57–66. OCLC 809125514.
- Campbell, N. J. M. (1979). "France". In Chesneau, Roger & Kolesnik, Eugene M. (eds.). Conway's All the World's Fighting Ships 1860–1905. Greenwich: Conway Maritime Press. pp. 283–333. ISBN 0-8317-0302-4.
- Corbett, Julian Stafford (1920). Naval Operations: To The Battle of the Falklands, December 1914. Vol. I. London: Longmans, Green & Co. OCLC 174823980.
- Couhat, Jean Labayle (1974). French Warships of World War I. London: Ian Allan. ISBN 0-7110-0445-5.
- Harvey, George, ed. (10 November 1906). "Heroism and Suffering in the Typhoon at Hongkong". Harper's Weekly. Vol. L, no. 2603. New York: Harper & Brothers. pp. 1600–1601.
- Heaver, Stephen (19 June 2018). "French navy memorial in Hong Kong for five sailors who died in great typhoon of 1906 gets overdue restoration". South China Morning Post. Hong Kong.
- Jordan, John & Caresse, Philippe (2019). French Armoured Cruisers 1887–1932. Barnsley: Seaforth Publishing. ISBN 978-1-5267-4118-9.
- Jordan, John & Caresse, Philippe (2017). French Battleships of World War One. Annapolis, Maryland: Naval Institute Press. ISBN 978-1-59114-639-1.
- "Latest Telegraphic Intelligence". The North China Herald and Supreme Court and Consular Gazette. LXXXII. Shanghai: North China Daily News and Herald Ltd.: 138–149 18 January 1907.
- Le Masson, Henri (1967). Histoire du Torpilleur en France [History of the Torpedo-armed Ship in France]. Paris: Académie de marine. OCLC 491016784.
- Lim, Patricia (2011). Forgotten Souls: A Social History of the Hong Kong Cemetery. Hong Kong: Hong Kong University Press. ISBN 9789622099906.
- Mok, Hing Yang; Shun, Chi Ming; Davies, Stephen; Lui, Wing Hong; Lau, Dick Shum; Cheung, Kai Chun; Kong, Kwan Yin; Chan, Sai Tick (September 2022), "A historical re-analysis of the calamitous midget typhoon passing through Hong Kong on 18 September 1906 and its storm surge impact to Hong Kong", Tropical Cyclone Research and Review, 11 (3), Elsevier B.V. on behalf of KeAi Communication Co. Ltd.: 174–218, doi:10.1016/j.tcrr.2022.09.005, S2CID 252856181 Under a Creative Commons license
- Prévoteaux, Gérard (2017). La marine française dans la Grande guerre: les combattants oubliés: Tome II 1916–1918 [The French Navy during the Great War: The Forgotten Combatants, Book II 1916–1918]. Collection Navires & Histoire des Marines du Mond. Vol. 27. Le Vigen, France: Éditions Lela presse. ISBN 978-2-37468-001-9.
- Roberts, Stephen S. (2021). French Warships in the Age of Steam 1859–1914: Design, Construction, Careers and Fates. Barnsley, UK: Seaforth Publishing. ISBN 978-1-5267-4533-0.
- Silverstone, Paul H. (2006). The New Navy, 1883–1922. New York City: Routledge. ISBN 0-415-97871-8.
- Staff, Gary (2011). Battle on the Seven Seas. Barnsley: Pen & Sword Maritime. ISBN 978-1-84884-182-6.
- Stanglini, Ruggero & Cosentino, Michelle (2022). The French Fleet: Ships, Strategy and Operations, 1870–1918. Barnsley: Seaforth Publishing. ISBN 978-1-5267-0131-2.
