= Battle of Penang =

1914 naval battle of the First World War

- Part of the Asian theatre of World War I
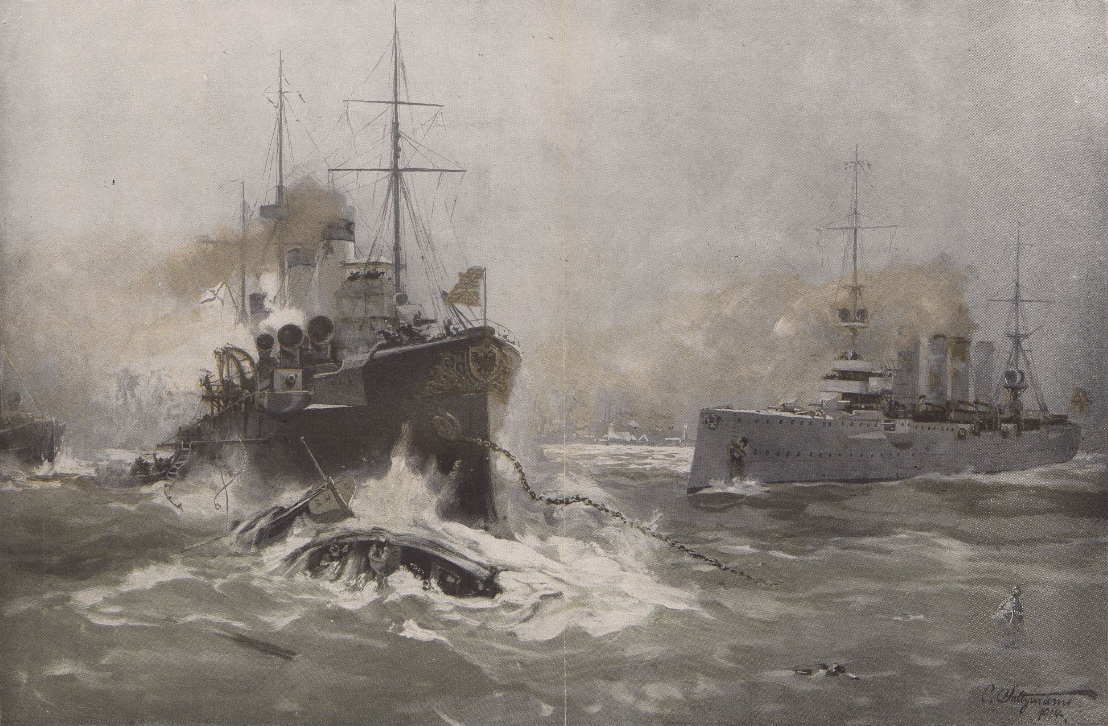
- SMS Emden passing through the Penang Strait over the French torpedo boat, behind Zhemchug (painting by Carl Saltzmann)
Date	28 October 1914
Location	Penang Strait, off Penang, Straits Settlements 5°24′19″N 100°21′9″E
Result	German victory

Belligerents
(Russian Empire) Russia; France; (British Empire) Great Britain	(German Empire) Germany

Commanders and leaders
(Russian Empire) I. A. Cherkassov; (France) Félix Théroinne †	(German Empire) Karl von Müller

Strength
1 protected cruiser; 1 cruiser; 2 destroyers	1 light cruiser

Casualties and losses
135 killed; 157 wounded; 1 protected cruiser sunk; 1 destroyer sunk	None

The Battle of Penang (Russian: Бой у Пенанга; French: Combat de Penang; German: Schlacht von Penang) was a surprise naval engagement by the Imperial German Navy's East Asia Squadron during the First World War that took place on 28 October 1914. The battle involved the German cruiser SMS Emden in the Penang Strait, which sank two Allied warships as part of its commerce raiding operations throughout the Indian Ocean. During the battle, a total of 135 French and Russian sailors were killed and 157 others were wounded, while the Germans sustained no casualties. It was the only battle of the war fought in British Malaya.

== Background ==
At the time, Penang was part of the Straits Settlements, a British Crown colony. Penang is an island off the west coast of Malaya, now the present day Malaysia. It is only a short distance from the mainland. The main town of Penang, George Town, is on a harbour. In the early months of the war, it was heavily used by Allied naval and merchant vessels.

Shortly after the outbreak of the war, the German East Asia Squadron left its base in Tsingtao, China. The squadron headed east for Germany, but one ship, the light cruiser SMS Emden under Lt. Commander Karl von Müller was sent on a solitary raiding mission.

== Battle ==
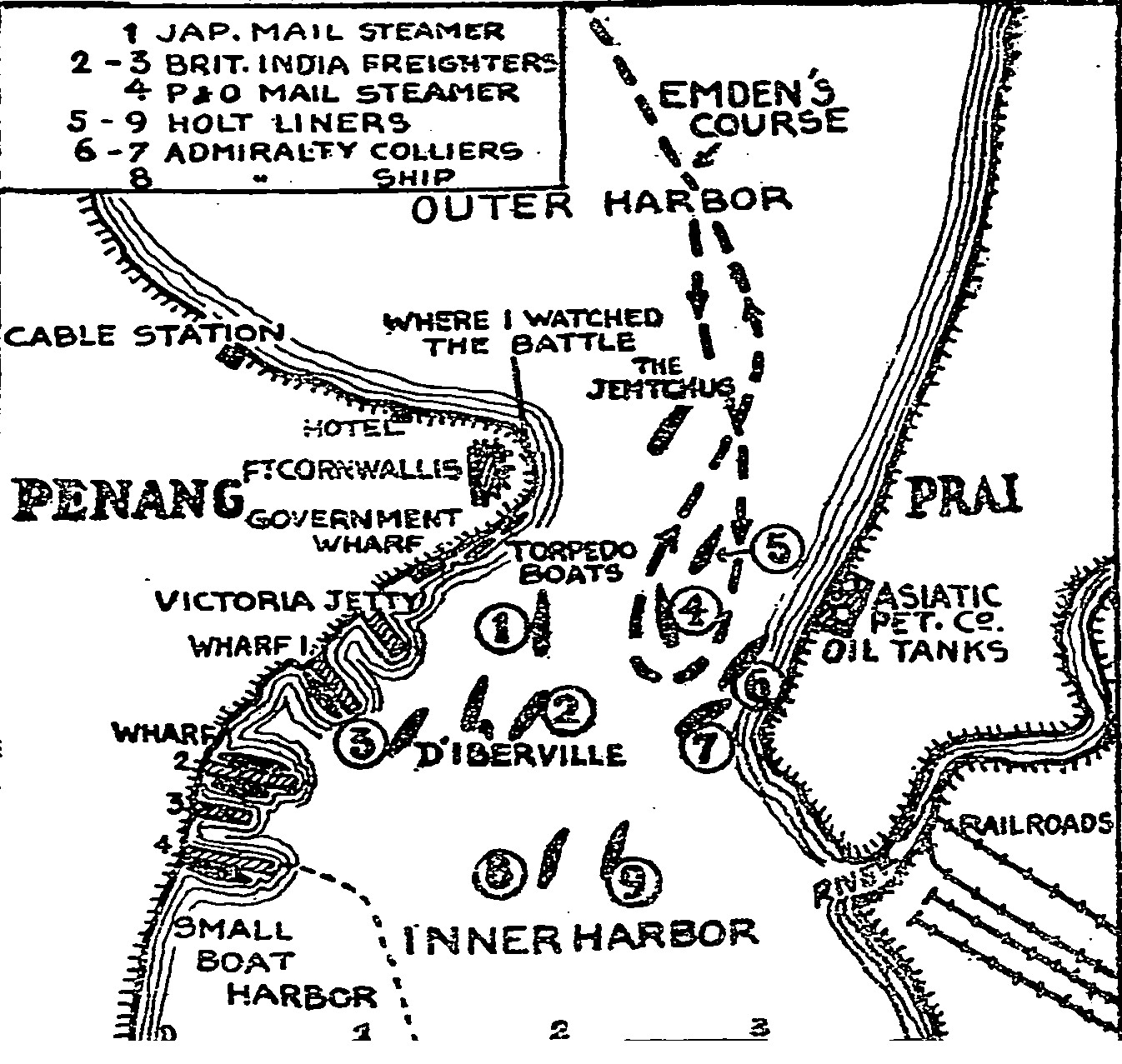
Map from 1914 New York Times

Eyewitness description by a New York Times correspondent
Text: The Emden at Panang (1914)
00:19:16

At about 04:30 on 28 October, the Emden appeared off the George Town roads to attack the harbour defences and any enemy vessels she might find there. Captain von Müller had disguised his ship by rigging a false smoke stack, which made the Emden resemble the British light cruiser HMS Yarmouth. Once he had entered the harbour, however, he ran up the Imperial German naval ensign and revealed his identity to one and all. He then launched a torpedo at the Imperial Russian protected cruiser Zhemchug, following it up with a salvo of shells which riddled the ship. As the Zhemchug struggled to return fire, von Müller launched a second torpedo. It penetrated the Zhemchug's forward magazine, causing an explosion that sank the Russian warship. Casualties among the Zhemchug's crew of 250 amounted to 88 dead and 121 wounded.

The old French cruiser D'Iberville and the French destroyer Fronde by now had opened fire on the Emden, but both were wildly inaccurate and von Müller simply ignored them as he turned to leave the harbour unharmed. While stopping to try to pick up a harbour pilot, he met the French destroyer Mousquet, returning from a patrol. Caught by surprise, the French ship was quickly sunk by the German cruiser's guns.

== Aftermath ==
The Zhemchug had been tied up in a state of non-readiness while her captain, Cmdr. Baron I. A. Cherkassov, went ashore that night to visit his wife (some accounts say his mistress). The keys for the ship's magazine had been taken ashore and no lookouts had been posted. Cherkassov watched in helpless horror from the Eastern & Oriental Hotel as his ship sank to the bottom of the Straits. He was court-martialled for negligence and was sentenced to 3½ years in prison, reduction in rank, and expulsion from the navy. His deputy, Lt. Kulibin, was sentenced to 1½ years in prison. However, Tsar Nicholas II reduced the sentences, and the two former officers were ordered to serve as ordinary seamen. Both would later distinguish themselves in combat and they were decorated with the Cross of St. George.

Lt. Félix Théroinne, who commanded the Mousquet, was among those killed in the action. Thirty-six survivors out of the destroyer's crew of 80 were rescued by the Emden. Three of the French sailors died from their injuries and were buried at sea with military honours. Two days after the battle, the Emden stopped the British steamer Newburn and transferred the remaining French prisoners to her. She was then released and conveyed the prisoners to Sabang, Sumatra, then part of the neutral Dutch East Indies.

The Emden continued her successful raiding mission for another 10 days, before she was encountered by the more powerful Royal Australian Navy light cruiser Sydney. The Sydney's heavier and longer range guns enabled her to severely damage the Emden, which had to be run aground and surrendered at the Battle of Cocos.

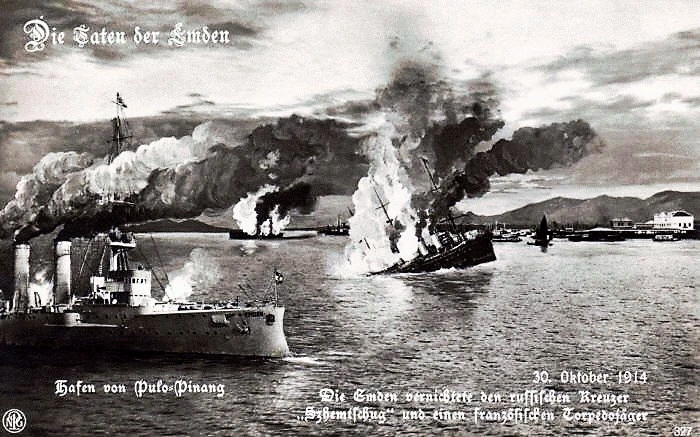
Depiction of the battle in a German postcard

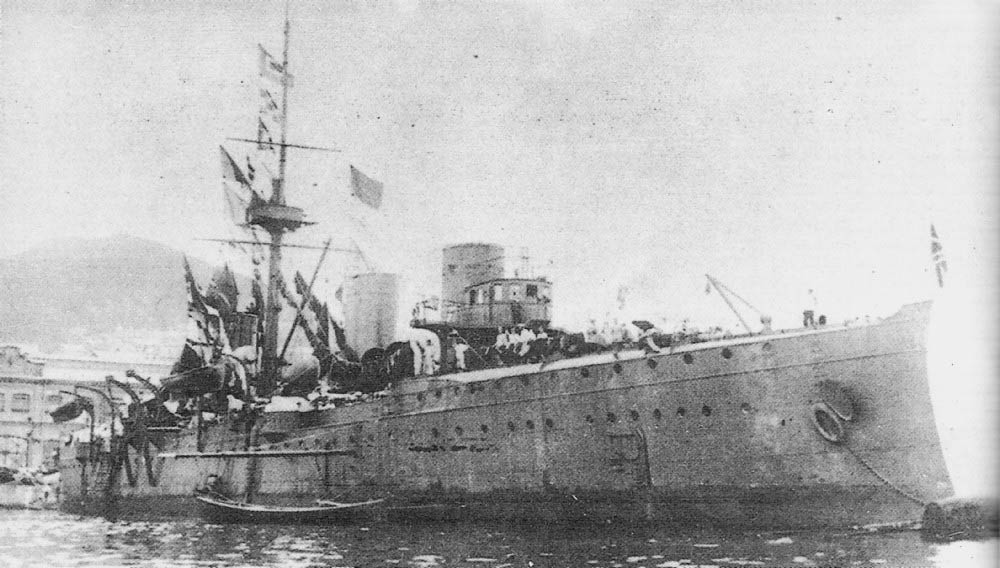
Zhemchug, after 1909

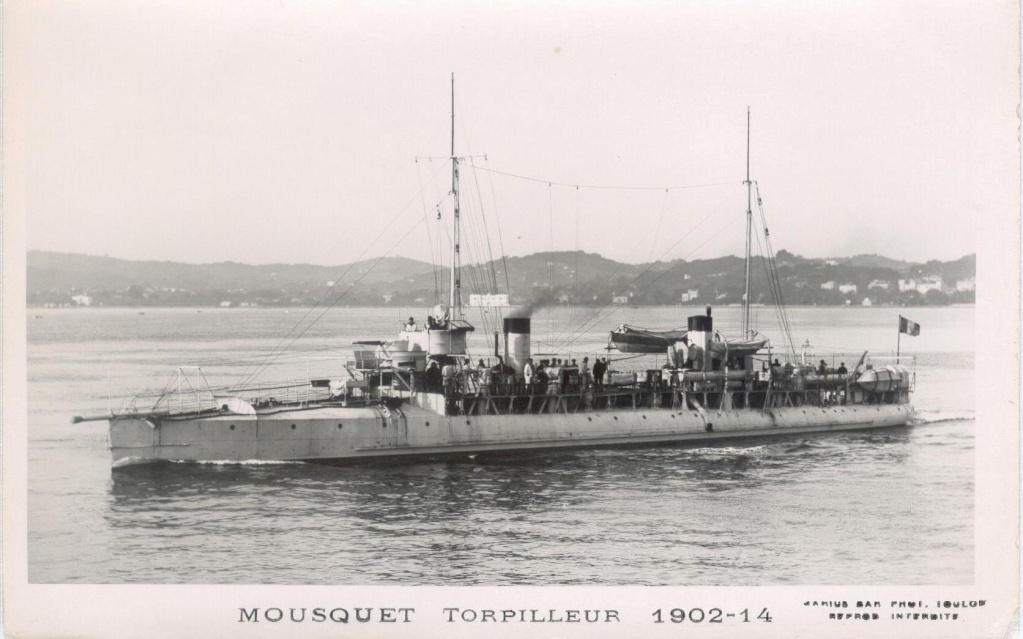
Mousquet, undated

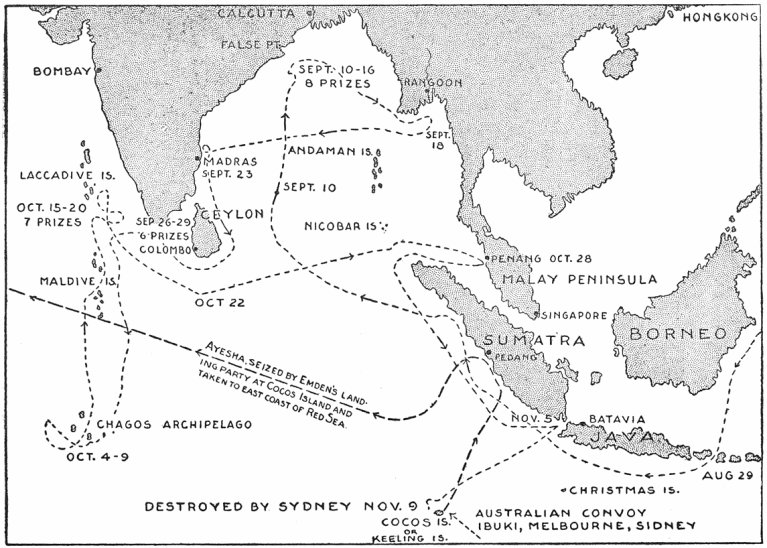
Route taken by Emden during her commerce raiding operations

== Legacy ==
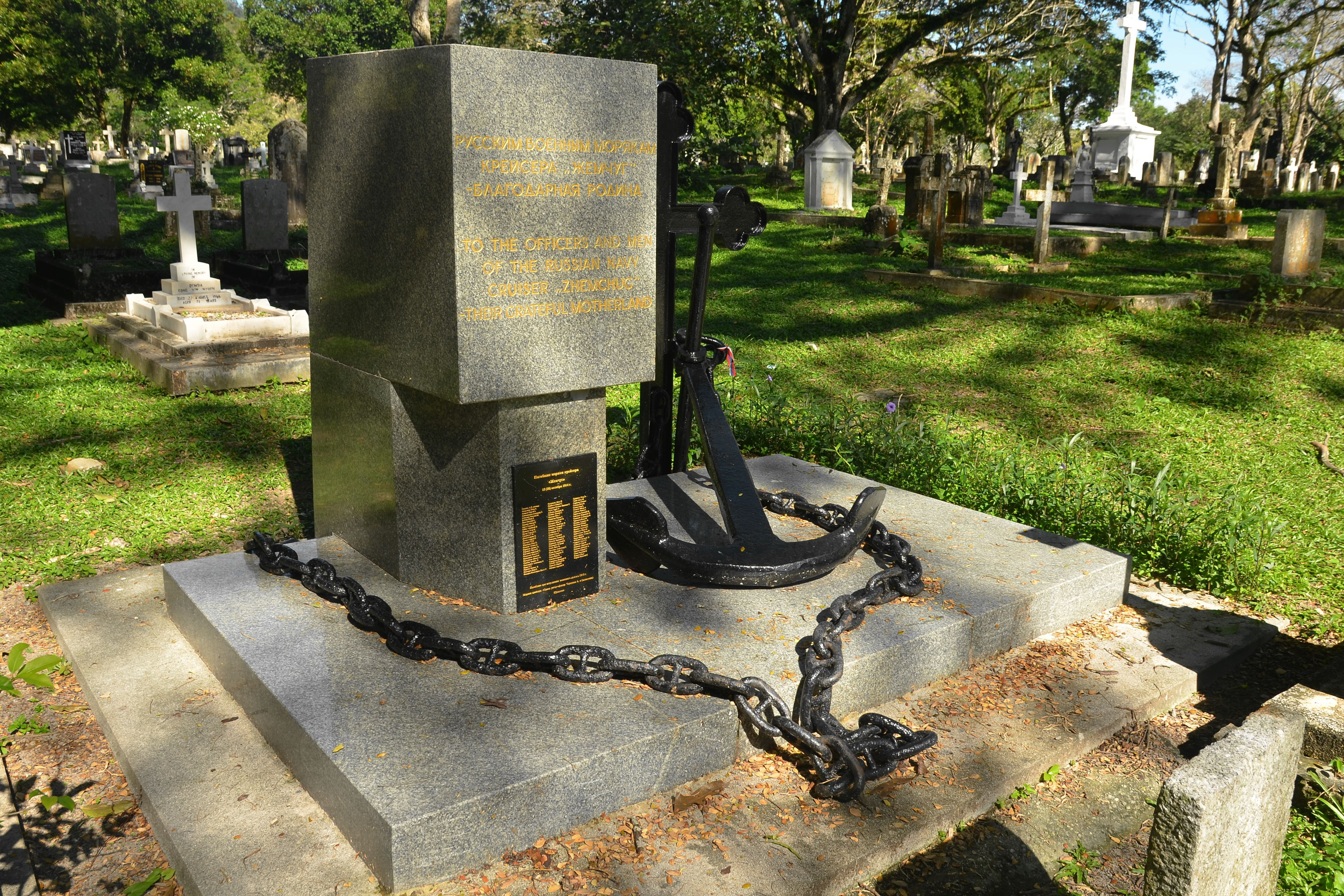
Zhemchug memorial at the Western Road Cemetery, Penang

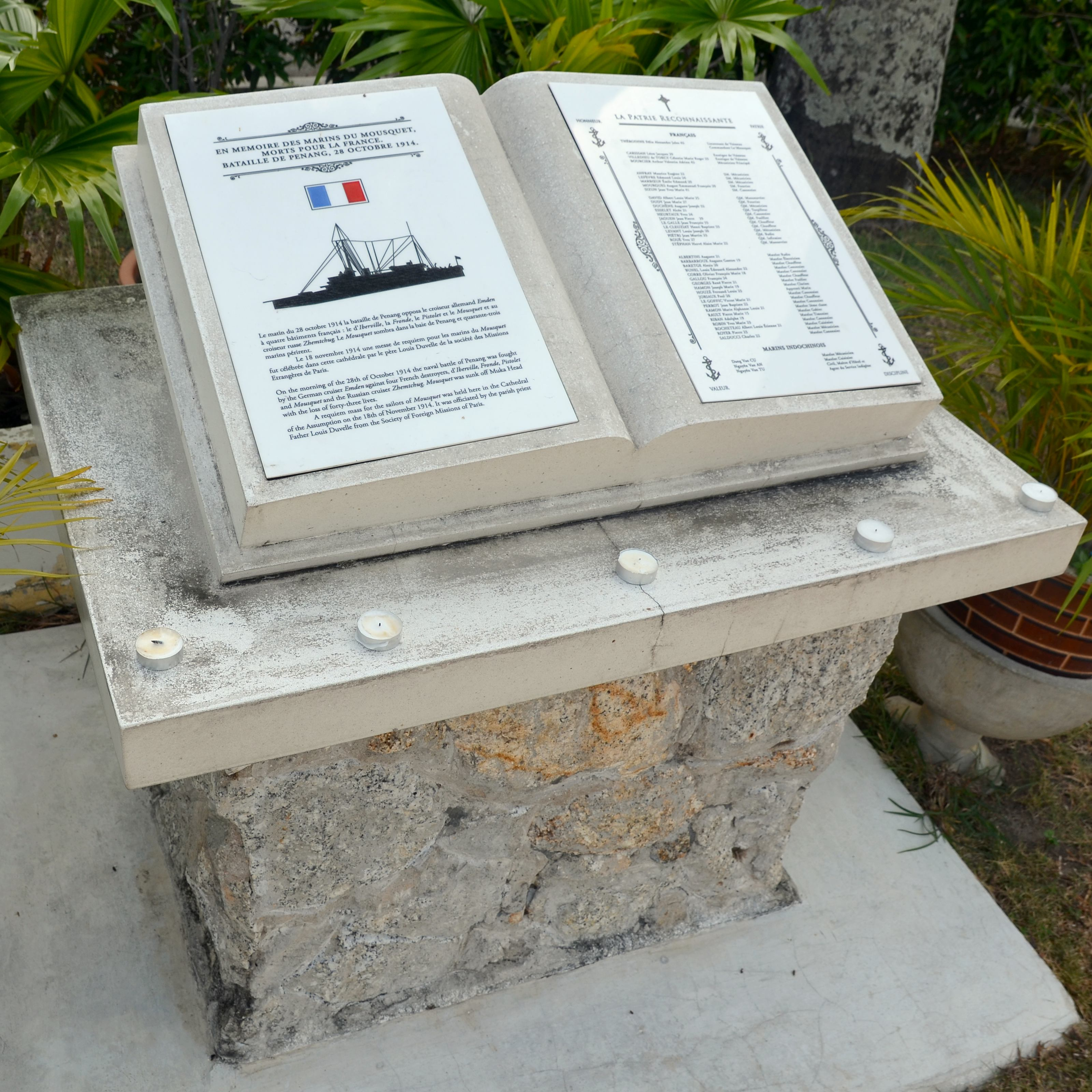
Mousquet memorial at the Church of the Assumption (Penang)

A total of 12 Russian sailors are buried at two sites in George Town – the Western Road Cemetery and on Jerejak Island. The monument honoring the sailors of Zhemchug was twice renovated by Soviet sailors in 1972 and 1987 respectively. The battle was mentioned numerous times by Vladimir Putin on his 2003 presidential visit to Malaysia. The Russian embassy in Malaysia holds memorial services twice annually in honor of the fallen sailors. In October 2024, corvettes Aldar Tsydenzhapov, Gromkiy and Rezkiy, along with replenishment oiler Pechanga, arrived in George Town where the crews attended a ceremony to commemorate the 110th anniversary of the Battle of Penang.

== See also ==
- Bombardment of Madras
- Battle of Cocos
- Weeratunge Edward Perera
