= Izumrud-class cruiser =

1903 class of Russian cruisers

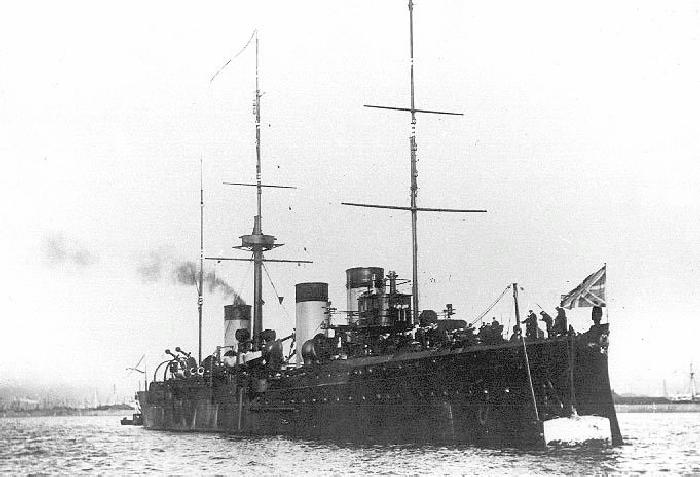
- Izumrud

Class overview
- Name: Izumrud class
- Builders: Nevski Works
- Operators: Imperial Russian Navy
- Completed: 2
- Lost: 2

General characteristics
- Type: Protected cruiser
- Displacement: 3,103 long tons (3,153 t)
- Length: 111 m (364 ft 2 in)
- Beam: 12.2 m (40 ft)
- Draught: 5 m (16 ft 5 in)
- Installed power: 16 Yarrow boilers; 17,000 hp (13,000 kW)
- Propulsion: 3 shafts, 3 triple-expansion steam engines
- Speed: 24 knots (44 km/h; 28 mph)
- Range: 3,790 nmi (7,020 km; 4,360 mi)
- Complement: 350
- Armament: 6 × 120 mm (4.7 in) guns; 6 × 47 mm (1.9 in) guns; 2 × 37 mm (1.5 in) guns; 3 × 381 mm (15.0 in) torpedo tubes

The Izumrud class were a group of two protected cruisers built for the Imperial Russian Navy.

The two ships Izumrud ("emerald") and Zhemchug ("pearl"), were copies of newly designed cruiser, Novik, that was built at the Schichau yard in Danzig, German Empire. With the prototype purchased copies were soon underway at the Nyevsky Shipyard in St. Petersburg between 1901 and 1904.

== Specifications ==
The two Russian-built cruisers were 111m x 12.2m x 4.88m in size with a standard weight of 3,050 tons. They were armed with six 120 mm 45 caliber guns, six 47mm Hotchkiss 3-pounder guns, two 37mm Hotchkiss 1-pounder guns and three 356mm torpedo tubes.

For propulsion the ships would carry 5/600 tons of coal to fuel their 16 coal-fired Yarrow boilers, which combined would give 19,000 horsepower through its three screws turbines. The ships could go a distance of 3,790 nautical miles if kept at 10 knots, while their top speed was 24 knots.

They would be crewed by a complement of 334 hands.

== Service history ==
=== Russo-Japanese War ===
After the attack on Port Arthur on the night of 8 February 1904, which started the Russo-Japanese war Novik was the only ship to make a valiant effort and not be caught off guard. Novik would later be a part of the Battle of the Yellow Sea on 10 August 1904, however after outrunning her opponents for some time and aiding the escape of her comrades on other ships she was eventually cornered in Aniva Bay where the captain had her scuttled. However, the job was not done so well and eventually was refloated by the Japanese who would use Novik themselves for 6 years as the Suzuya.

Battle of Tsushima Straits

Of Izumrud and Zhemchug, after the nighttime raid on Port Arthur the Tzar had all available vessels sent from the Baltic to the Sea of Togo to reinforce Port Arthur and reclaim the surrounding waters.

At the Tsushima Straits after sailing 18,000 kilometres (11,000 mi) the fleet was set upon and began to make a run for it in retreat, eventually the faster ships made in to Manila where they would seek refuge. Zhemchug was amongst those few and would therefore survive the battles. Of the 34 ships that had sailed from Russia, only 6 would survive the debacle.

As for Izumrud, she had decided to make a run for the Russian port of Vladivostok and had nearly managed to escape her pursuers, but in the dead of night she ran aground, just 60 kilometres (37 mi) from the port. The crew escaped and would finally reach Vladivostok overland two days later.

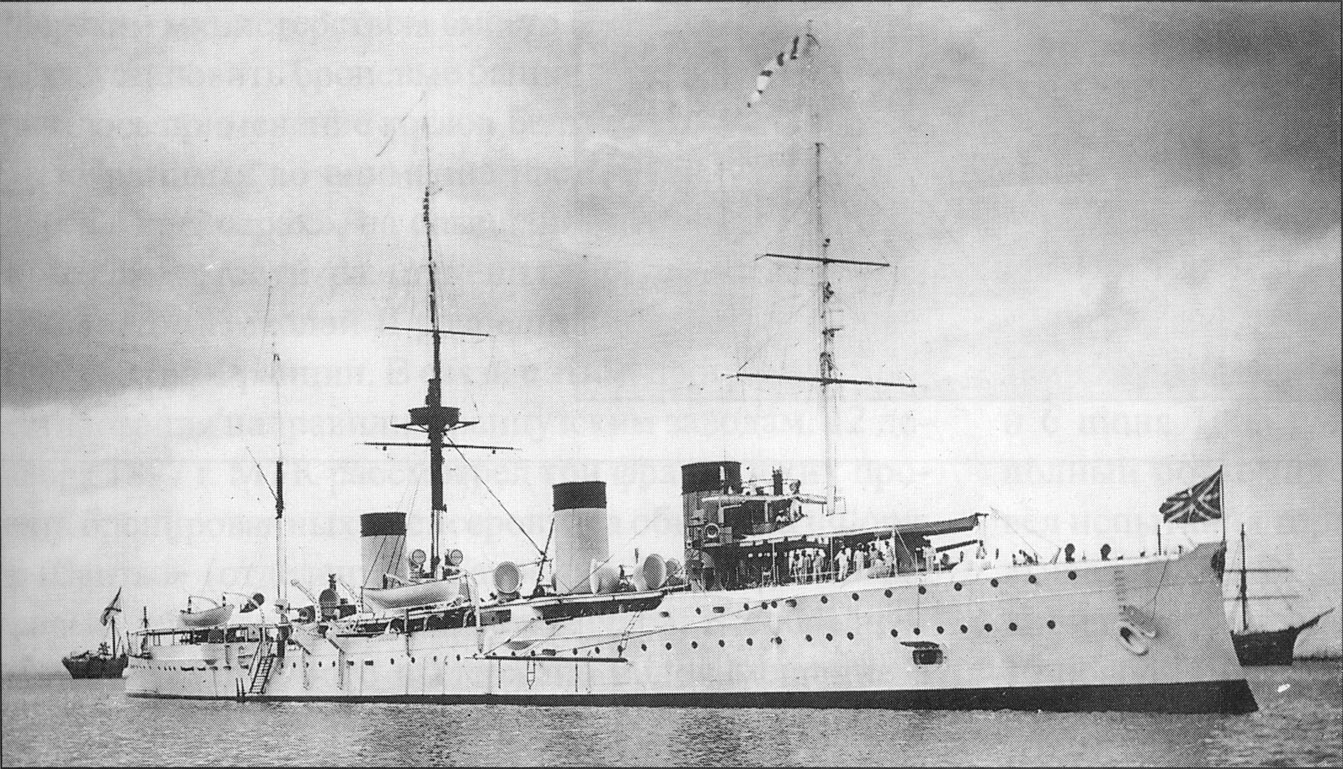
Zhemchug in Vladivostok in 1906

=== Zhemchug's fate ===
As for Zhemchug, she would survive into World War I, when attached with the British Asiatic Fleet in Penang and a few French ships they were set upon in a surprise raid by the German cruiser SMS Emden on 28 October 1914. Zhemchug's main magazine store had been hit and she sank with 89 crew being killed and 143 wounded. Her commander was found negligent for being ashore with his mistress, with the magazine stores keys and having made no preparations. He would spend 3 1/2 years in prison.

== Bibliography ==
- Budzbon, Przemysław (1985). "Russia". In Gray, Randal (ed.). Conway's All the World's Fighting Ships 1906–1921. Annapolis, Maryland: Naval Institute Press. pp. 291–325. ISBN 0-85177-245-5.
- Campbell, N. J. M. (1979). "Russia". In Chesneau, Roger & Kolesnik, Eugene M. (eds.). Conway's All the World's Fighting Ships 1860–1905. New York: Mayflower Books. pp. 170–217. ISBN 0-8317-0302-4.
