= Russian cruiser Zhemchug =

Russian cruiser

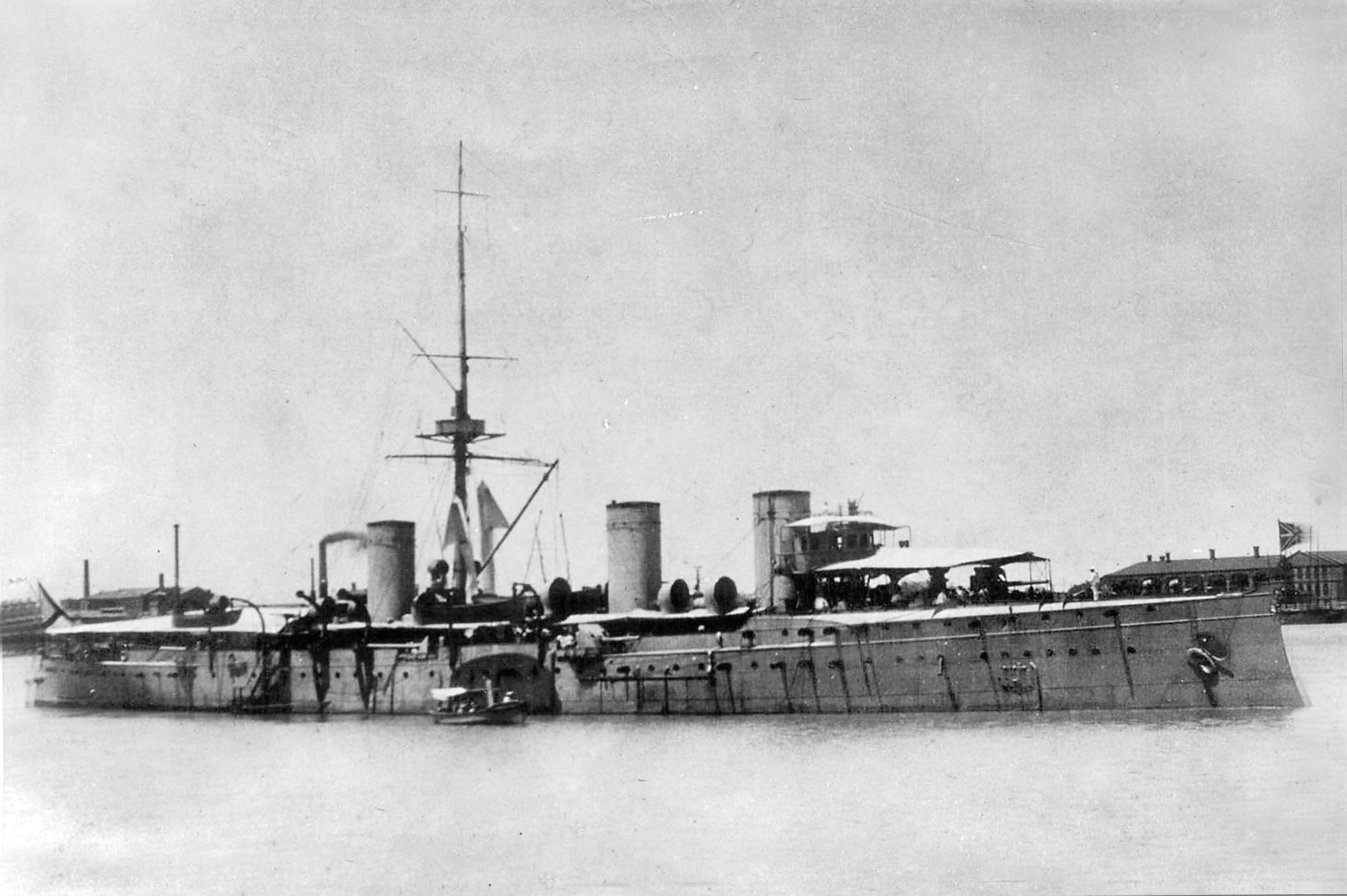
- Zhemchug

History

Russian Empire
- Name: Zhemchug
- Builder: Nevski Works, St Petersburg, Russia
- Laid down: 19 January 1901
- Launched: 14 August 1903
- Commissioned: 26 July 1904
- Fate: Sunk in the Battle of Penang, 28 October 1914

General characteristics
- Class & type: Izumrud-class protected cruiser
- Displacement: 3,103 long tons (3,153 t)
- Length: 110.95 m (364 ft 0 in) (waterline); 111.30 m (365 ft 2 in) (o/a)
- Beam: 12.2 m (40 ft)
- Draught: 4.9 m (16 ft 1 in)
- Installed power: 16 Yarrow boilers; 17,000 ihp (13,000 kW)
- Propulsion: 3 shaft; 3 triple-expansion steam engines
- Speed: 24.5 knots (45.4 km/h; 28.2 mph)
- Range: 2,090 nmi (3,870 km; 2,410 mi) at 12 knots (22 km/h; 14 mph)
- Complement: 354 officers and crewmen
- Armament: 8 × 120 mm (4.7 in) Canet guns; 4 × 47 mm (1.9 in) Hotchkiss guns; 6 × 7.62 mm Maxim machine guns; 3 × 381 mm (15 in) torpedo tubes
- Armour: Krupp armour; 32–76 mm (1.3–3.0 in) on sloping deck; 32 mm (1.3 in) on belt

Zhemchug (Russian: Жемчуг, "Pearl") was the second of the two-vessel Izumrud class of protected cruisers built for the Imperial Russian Navy. She was sunk during World War I by the German light cruiser Emden in the Battle of Penang in 1914.

== Background ==
Zhemchug was ordered as part of the Imperial Russian Navy's plan to expand the Russian Pacific Fleet based at Port Arthur and Vladivostok to counter the growing threat posed by the Imperial Japanese Navy towards Russian hegemony in Manchuria and Korea.

== Operational history ==
Zhemchug was laid down at the Nevski Works in Petrograd, Russia in January 1901. However, construction was delayed due to priority given to completion of the Novik. The Zakladka, or formal ceremony of laying a plate, took place on 14 June 1902, in the presence of Grand Duke Alexei Alexandrovich.

She was launched on 14 August 1903, in the presence of Tsar Nicholas II and Dowager Empress Maria Feodorovna. Construction continued to be plagued by delays, including flooding in November, and an ice storm in December. However, with the start of the Russo-Japanese War in early 1904, construction efforts were greatly accelerated. Mooring tests were completed by 26 July 1904 and speed trials were held on 5 August. Zhemchug was formally commissioned on 29 August 1904 and was assigned to the Second Pacific Squadron of the Russian Pacific Fleet. On 27 September 1904, she participated in a naval review off Reval attended by Tsar Nicholas II, and departed for the Far East the following day.

=== During the Russo-Japanese War ===
Under the overall command of Admiral Zinovy Rozhestvensky, Zhemchug was part of the Second Pacific Squadron intended to relieve the Japanese siege of Port Arthur. However, she separated from the main squadron at Tangiers and transited the Suez Canal, and rejoined the main fleet at Madagascar. During the transit of the Indian Ocean, she acted as a scout for the main fleet and was frequently on detached duty. Conditions during the voyage were appalling, with the ship overloaded with coal for the voyage, even in the crew compartments, and the crewmen suffering from the unaccustomed tropical heat, poor food and poor hygiene and frequently mechanical failures. One crewman ran amok off Madagascar and had to be shot.

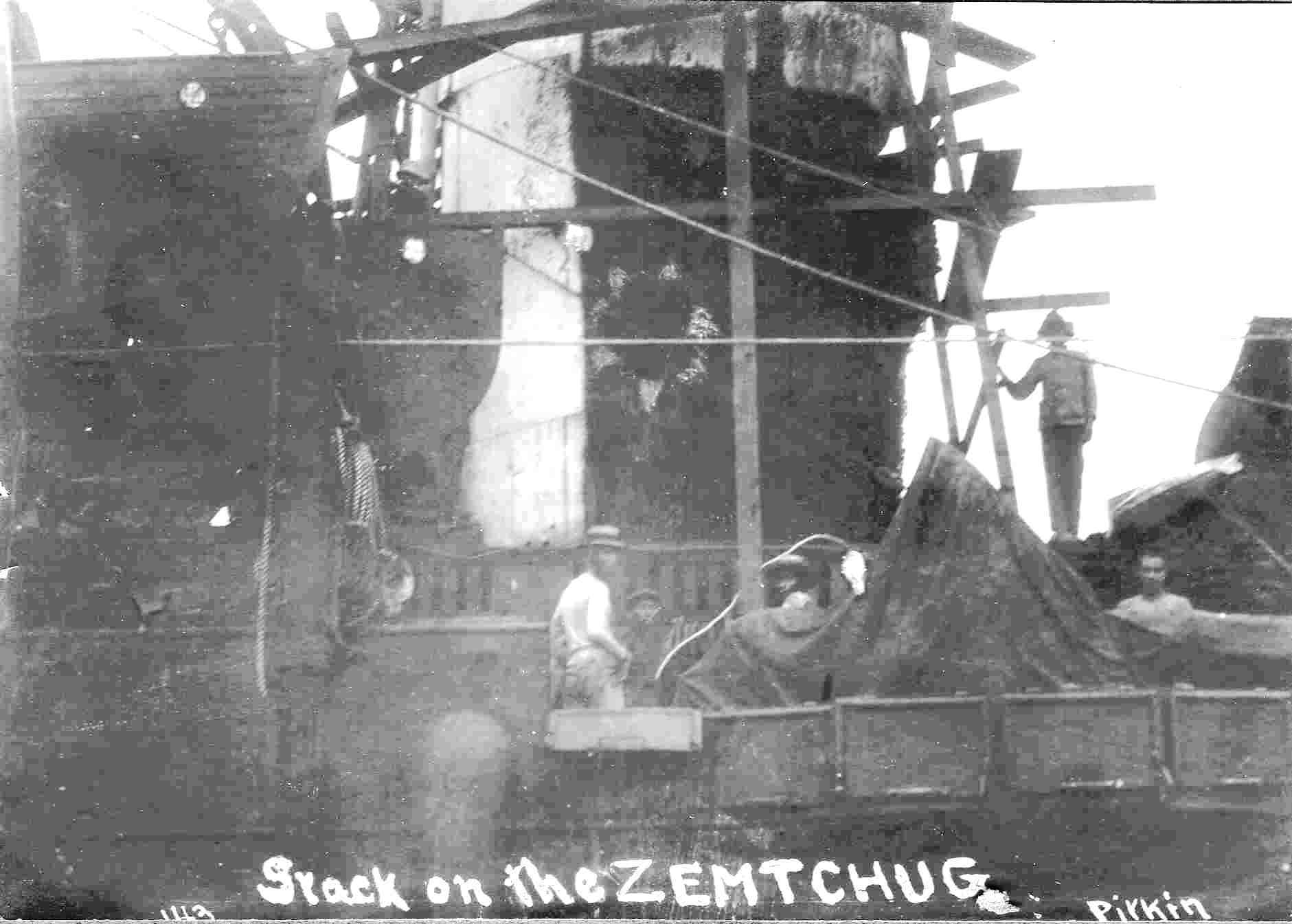
Battle damage to cruiser Zhemchug inflicted at the Battle of Tsushima. Note shell hole in stack. Photo taken in June, 1905, at Manila Bay

The Second Pacific Squadron took part in the decisive Battle of Tsushima from 27–28 May 1905 and, as part of Admiral Oskar Enkvist's cruiser division, Zhemchug was one of the first ships to open fire on the Japanese Combined Fleet. She took severe damage in the battle, taking 17 hits, with 2 officers and 10 crewmen killed and 32 crewmen seriously wounded. However, she managed to escape sinking or capture after the Russian defeat, and together with the cruisers Aurora and Oleg, she reached the neutral port of Manila on 21 May 1905 and was interned by the United States on 25 May until the end of the war.

She was repaired in October 1905, and returned to active service.

=== With the Siberian Flotilla ===
During the 1905 Russian Revolution, Zhemchug's crew mutinied, and joined the riot in the streets of Vladivostok. On the suppression of the unrest, the crew was arrested and court-martialed.

From 1905–1910, Zhemchug remained based at Vladivostok, but was in poor repair and could make only short patrols or occasional trips to Korean, Japanese or Chinese ports. She was in overhaul for most of 1910. In 1911, she was appointed flagship of the Siberian Flotilla. She was placed on reserve status in 1912, and was used as a guard ship at the foreign concessions at Shanghai and Yangzi River from 1913–1914, protecting Russian citizens and economic interests. She returned to Vladivostok in May 1914, and was assigned Commander Baron I A Cherkassov as captain.

=== World War I service ===
At the start of World War I, Zhemchug was part of the Allied (British-French-Japanese) joint task force pursuing the German East Asia Squadron under Admiral Maximilian von Spee, and operated in the Bay of Bengal together with the Imperial Japanese Navy cruiser Chikuma.

Zhemchug had put into Penang on 26 October for repairs and to clean her boilers; only one boiler was in service, which meant that she could not get under way, nor were her ammunition hoists powered. Against the advice of Admiral Martyn Jerram, commander-in-chief of the Allied Fleet, Commander Cherkassov had given most of his crew shore leave, and left the ship with all torpedoes disarmed, and all shells locked away save for 12 rounds stowed on deck with only five rounds of ready ammunition were permitted for each gun with a sixth chambered.

On 28 October 1914, Commander Cherkassov was at the Eastern & Oriental Hotel in George Town with a lady friend. The remaining crew were having a party on board rather than keeping watch. The German light cruiser Emden was disguised as a British warship and pulled alongside Zhemchug at a distance of 300 yards (270 m). At that range, Emden raised the Imperial German naval flag, launched a torpedo, and opened fire with her 10.5 cm guns. The torpedo hit near the aft funnel, blowing off the fantail of the cruiser and destroying the aft guns. To their credit, Zhemchug's crew managed to load and return fire with the front guns, but missed the German raider and struck a merchant ship in the harbor instead. Emden turned around and fired a second torpedo that struck the burning Zhemchug at the conning tower, causing a tremendous explosion that tore the ship apart. By the time the smoke cleared, Zhemchug had already slipped beneath the waves, her masts the only parts of the ship still above water. Cherkassov watched helplessly from shore as his cruiser was sunk. The sinking of Zhemchug killed 81 Russian sailors and wounded 129, of whom seven later died of their injuries. Emden afterwards sank the Mousquet which concluded the Battle of Penang.

A court-martial held in Vladivostok found Commander Cherkassov guilty of gross negligence and sentenced him to 3.5 years in prison. His executive officer, Lieutenant Kulibin, was sentenced to 18 months. In addition, both officers were stripped of their rank and decorations and were degraded from nobility to become commoners. The sentences were later commuted to 18 months by Tsar Nicholas II as sending to the front as ordinary seamen, where both men later distinguished themselves in combat and were decorated with the Cross of St. George.

The bodies of 82 crewmen were buried in Penang; the other seven bodies were never recovered. The ship's 120 mm (4.7 in) guns were salvaged by the Russian cruiser Oleg in December 1914. In the 1920s, the ship was partially raised and scrapped by British experts.

== Legacy ==
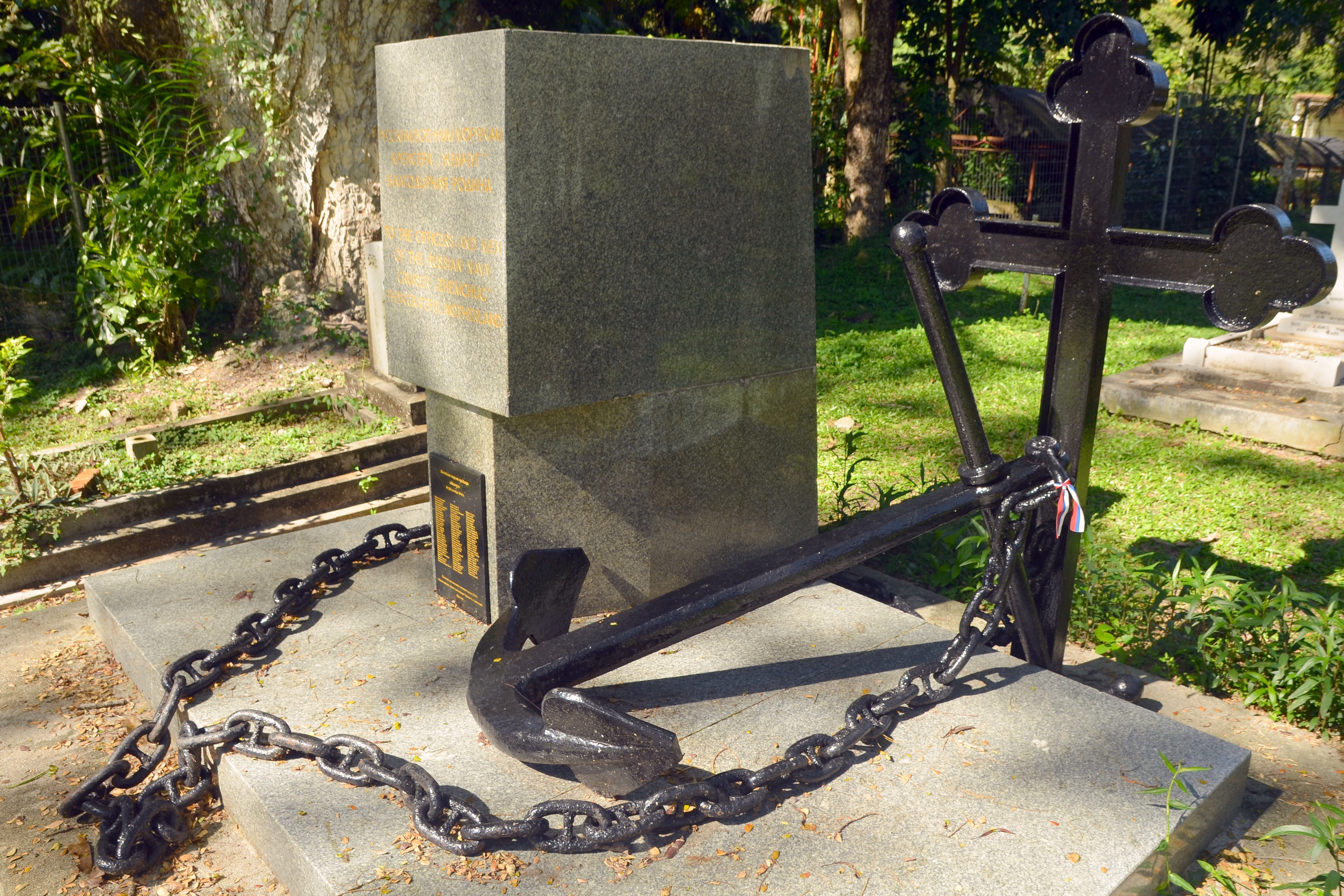
Zhemchug memorial at the Western Road Cemetery, Penang

A total of 12 Russian sailors are buried on Penang and Jerejak. The monument honouring the sailors of Zhemchug was twice renovated by Soviet sailors on 1972 and 1987 respectively. The battle was mentioned numerous times by Vladimir Putin on his 2003 presidential visit to Malaysia. The Russian embassy in Malaysia holds memorial services twice annually in honour of the fallen sailors.

== Bibliography ==
- Brook, Peter (2000). "Armoured Cruiser vs. Armoured Cruiser: Ulsan 14 August 1904". In Preston, Antony (ed.). Warship 2000–2001. London: Conway Maritime Press. ISBN 0-85177-791-0.
- Budzbon, Przemysław (1985). "Russia". In Gray, Randal (ed.). Conway's All the World's Fighting Ships 1906–1921. Annapolis, Maryland: Naval Institute Press. pp. 291–325. ISBN 0-85177-245-5.
- Campbell, N. J. M. (1979). "Russia". In Chesneau, Roger & Kolesnik, Eugene M. (eds.). Conway's All the World's Fighting Ships 1860–1905. New York: Mayflower Books. pp. 170–217. ISBN 0-8317-0302-4.
- McLaughlin, Stephen (1999). "From Ruirik to Ruirik: Russia's Armoured Cruisers". In Preston, Antony (ed.). Warship 1999–2000. London: Conway Maritime Press. ISBN 0-85177-724-4.
- Watts, Anthony J. (1990). The Imperial Russian Navy. London: Arms and Armour. ISBN 0-85368-912-1.
