= Hermann Kraushaar =

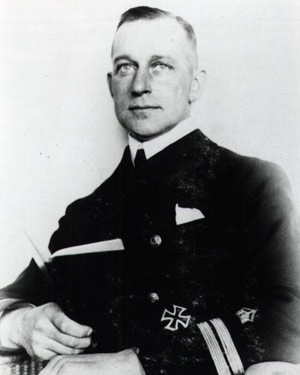
- Born: 25 March 1881; Voerde, Rhine Province, German Empire
- Died: 14 June 1917 (aged 36); Vlieland, Friesland, Netherlands
- Military career
- Allegiance: German Empire
- Branch: Imperial German Navy: Navy Airship Detachment
- Service years: 1909–1917
- Rank: Kapitänleutnant
- Conflicts: World War I: Action of 4 May 1917 †
- Awards: Iron Cross
- Other work: Der Luftkrieg, Berlin 1909

Hermann Kraushaar (23 May 1881 – 14 June 1917) was a German naval officer and airship commander. He was the bearer of the Iron Cross, first and second class.

== Early life ==
Hermann Kraushaar was born on 23 May 1881 in Voerde. He embarked on a career as an officer in the German Navy on 1909 and was given the rank of Lieutenant. He also created the book Der Luftkrieg of which the English author Richard Patrick Hearne made an authorized translation. At that time he was an adjutant at the 1st Marine Artillery Department in Kiel. On 22 March 1910 he was promoted to lieutenant captain. From 1913 he served as an audit officer on the SMS Hansa.

== World War I ==
During World War I, Lieutenant Hermann Kraushaar took command of various zeppelins. His first officer was always Lieutenant at Sea Ernst Zimmermann. They operated from bases in Hamburg-Fuhlsbüttel, Hage, Tønder, Friedrichshafen, and Ahlhorn. They completed their fifty-six journeys with the following airships:

- L 6 from 15 April 1916 to 1 May 1916 (9 trips)
- L 9 from 10 June 1916 to 14 July 1916 (14 trips, from 2 July from Tønder)
- L 17 from 10 August 1916 to 28 December 1916 (22 trips from Tønder)
- L 43 from 15 March 1917 to 14 June 1917 (11 trips)

== Bombing of Nottingham ==
On the night of 23 to 24 September 1916, Kraushaar flew an attack on the United Kingdom in the Zeppelin L 17. Between 22 and 23 o'clock he reached the coast of Lincolnshire. At about 1 a.m. he bombed Nottingham. The lighting at the Midland Railway station helped locate a suitable destination. Thirty-four incendiary bombs were dropped in the attack. Three residents died and sixteen were injured. Several houses and a Methodist church were destroyed. The Haddon factory and a warehouse were also affected. The L 17 turned over Lincoln and returned to the base. In his report, Kraushaar is said to have stated that Sheffield would have been bombed, which is however 50 km north of Nottingham.

== Naval action ==
On 4 May 1917, Kraushaar, in Zeppelin L 43, attacked an anti-submarine patrol off the Scottish coast which consisted of the destroyers HMS Obdurate, HMS Nepean, Pelican and Pylades led by the light cruisers HMS Dublin and the Australian HMAS Sydney. To avoid being hit by the anti-aircraft guns, the Zeppelin flew at a very high altitude out of range of the guns. For this reason, the bombs dropped also missed their targets. After the Zeppelin and the ships had used up their ammunition, the fight ended without a hit on either side.

== Final Flight and Death ==
On the night of 13/14 June 1917, Kraushaar set off on his last voyage in the Zeppelin L 43. On 14 June at 5:36 a.m. he reported that he had reached the lightship off the island of Terschelling. A short time earlier, at 6:15 a.m., the English Lieutenant Basil Hobbs took off from Felixstowe in a Curtiss H-12 seaplane. The gunner sub-lieutenant was Robert Dickey, the radio operator H. M. Davies and the engineer A. W. Goody. When they reached Vlieland at 8:40 a.m., they were flying at 500 ft (150 m). They discovered the Zeppelin L 43 flying north at 1,500 ft (460 m), which took them under fire with tracer ammunition. As they passed the stern, Dickey fired the Lewis machine gun, loaded with Brock-and-Pomeroy ammunition, into the hull of the Zeppelin. After two hits, the Zeppelin exploded; Kraushaar and his 23-man crew were killed.

== Bibliography ==
- Guttman, Jon (2018). Zeppelin vs British Home Defence 1915–18. Bloomsbury USA. ISBN 978-1-4728-2033-4.
