= HMS Pylades (1916) =

British M-Class destroyer

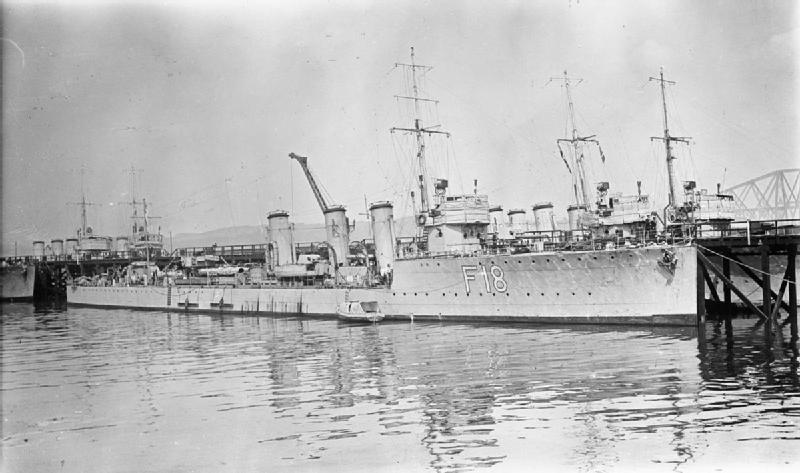
- Sister ship Paladin

History

United Kingdom
- Name: Pylades
- Namesake: Pylades
- Ordered: May 1915
- Builder: Stephens, Linthouse
- Laid down: 27 July 1915
- Launched: 28 September 1916
- Completed: 30 December 1916
- Out of service: 9 May 1921
- Fate: Sold to be broken up

General characteristics
- Class & type: Admiralty M-class destroyer
- Displacement: 1,026 long tons (1,042 t) (normal)
- Length: 273 ft 4 in (83.3 m) (o/a); 265 feet (80.8 m) (p.p.)
- Beam: 26 ft 8 in (8.1 m)
- Draught: 8 ft 11 in (2.7 m)
- Installed power: 3 Yarrow boilers, 27,800 shp (20,700 kW)
- Propulsion: Brown-Curtiss steam turbines, 3 shafts
- Speed: 34 knots (63 km/h; 39 mph)
- Range: 2,530 nmi (4,690 km; 2,910 mi) at 15 kn (28 km/h; 17 mph)
- Complement: 80
- Armament: 3 × single QF 4-inch (102 mm) guns; 2 × single 1-pdr 37 mm (1.5 in) AA guns; 2 × twin 21 in (533 mm) torpedo tubes

HMS Pylades was a Repeat Admiralty M-class destroyer that served in the Royal Navy during the First World War. The M class was an improvement on those of the preceding L class, capable of higher speed. Launched in 1916, Pylades joined the Thirteenth Destroyer Flotilla of the Grand Fleet. During the following year, the vessel defended the light cruisers Dublin and Sydney from the Zeppelin L 43 and participated in an extensive but unsuccessful search for German ships in the North Sea with the Sixth Light Cruiser Squadron. However, much of the remainder of the war was taken up in escort work, particularly as the British Admiralty increasingly used convoy as a weapon against German submarines, although the destroyer was not successful in destroying any German adversaries, After the Armistice that ended the war, Pylades was initially put in reserve and then sold in 1921 to be broken up.

== Design and development ==
Pylades was one of 18 Repeat Admiralty M-class destroyers ordered by the British Admiralty in late May 1915 as part of the Fifth War Programme during the First World War. The M class was an improved version of the earlier L-class, required to reach a higher speed in order to counter rumoured new German fast destroyers. The remit was to have a maximum speed of 36 knots (67 km/h; 41 mph) and, although ultimately the destroyers fell short of that ambition in service, the extra performance that was achieved was valued by the navy. It transpired that the German warships did not exist.

The destroyer had a length of 265 ft (80.8 m) between perpendiculars and 273 ft 4 in (83.3 m) overall, with a beam of 26 ft 8 in (8.1 m) and draught of 8 ft 11 in (2.7 m). Displacement was 948 long tons (963 t) normal. Power was provided by three Yarrow boilers feeding Brown-Curtiss steam turbines built by Beardmore and rated at 27,800 shaft horsepower (20,700 kW). The turbines drove three shafts and exhausted through three funnels. Design speed was 34 knots (63 km/h; 39 mph). A total of 228 long tons (232 t) of oil was carried. Design range was 2,530 nautical miles (4,690 km; 2,910 mi) at 15 knots (28 km/h; 17 mph), but actual endurance in service was less; sister ship Murray had a range of 2,240 nautical miles (4,150 km; 2,580 mi) at 15 knots (28 km/h; 17 mph).

Pylades had a main armament consisting of three single QF 4-inch (102 mm) Mk IV guns on the centreline, with one on the forecastle, one aft on a raised platform and one between the middle and aft funnels. Torpedo armament consisted of two twin torpedo tubes for 21 in (533 mm) torpedoes located aft of the funnels. Two single 1-pounder 37 mm (1.5 in) "pom-pom" anti-aircraft guns were carried. The anti-aircraft guns were later replaced by 2-pdr 40 mm (1.6 in) "pom-pom" guns. The ship had a complement of 80 officers and ratings.

== Construction and career ==
Pylades was laid down by Stephens on 27 July 1915 at Linthouse and launched on 28 September the following year. The vessel was completed by Beardmore on 30 December the following year, the sixth to be given the name in Royal Navy service, which recalled the legendary Greek prince Pylades. The ship was deployed as part of the Grand Fleet, joining the Thirteenth Destroyer Flotilla. Increasing activity from submarines against merchant shipping had led to the creation of a convoy system relying on destroyer escorts. The flotilla was called upon to accompany over 26 vessels a day as they sailed into and out of British ports. On 3 May, the destroyer formed part of the escort for the light cruisers Dublin and Sydney, along with sister ships Nepean, Obdurate and Pelican, on a routine patrol of the North Sea. During the following day, they were attacked by the Zeppelin L 43. The airship bombed the British ships, causing minor damage to Obdurate but otherwise causing no harm.

Sometimes Pylades was involved in more offensive action. On 16 October, the destroyer joined with five other destroyers and the Sixth Light Cruiser Squadron in an unsuccessful search for a suspected German force threatening the convoys in the North Sea. The destroyer lost touch with the main squadron but then met Cardiff and escorted that light cruiser back to Rosyth. Despite these measures, the German light cruisers Bremse and Brummer managed to attack the regular convoy between Norway and Britain two days later, sinking two destroyers, Mary Rose and Strongbow, and nine merchant ships before returning safely to Germany. The loss led to the Admiralty increasing the escort for future convoys to nine M-class destroyers.

At the end of the war, Pylades was a member of the Fourteenth Destroyer Flotilla. After the Armistice that ended the war in 1918, the Royal Navy returned to a peacetime level of strength and both the number of ships and personnel needed to be reduced to save money. The destroyer was allocated to the Defence Flotilla at Devonport. However, the harsh conditions of wartime operations, exacerbated by the fact that the hull was not galvanised, meant that the ship was soon worn out. Pylades was retired, and, on 9 May 1921, was sold to Thos. W. Ward of Hayle to be broken up.

== Pennant numbers ==
Pennant number	Date
F28	January 1917
F19	January 1918
G62	March 1918
H96	May 1918
F94	January 1919
