= SS Buresk =

SS Buresk is the name of the following ships, both built in 1914 by Richardson, Duck and Company in England:

- SS Buresk (sunk 1914), scuttled 9 November 1914 during capture by HMAS Sydney
- SS Buresk (sunk 1915), launched as Burford shelled and sunk by SM U-38 in the Mediterranean on 5 November 1915
