= HMS Nepean =

British M-Class destroyer

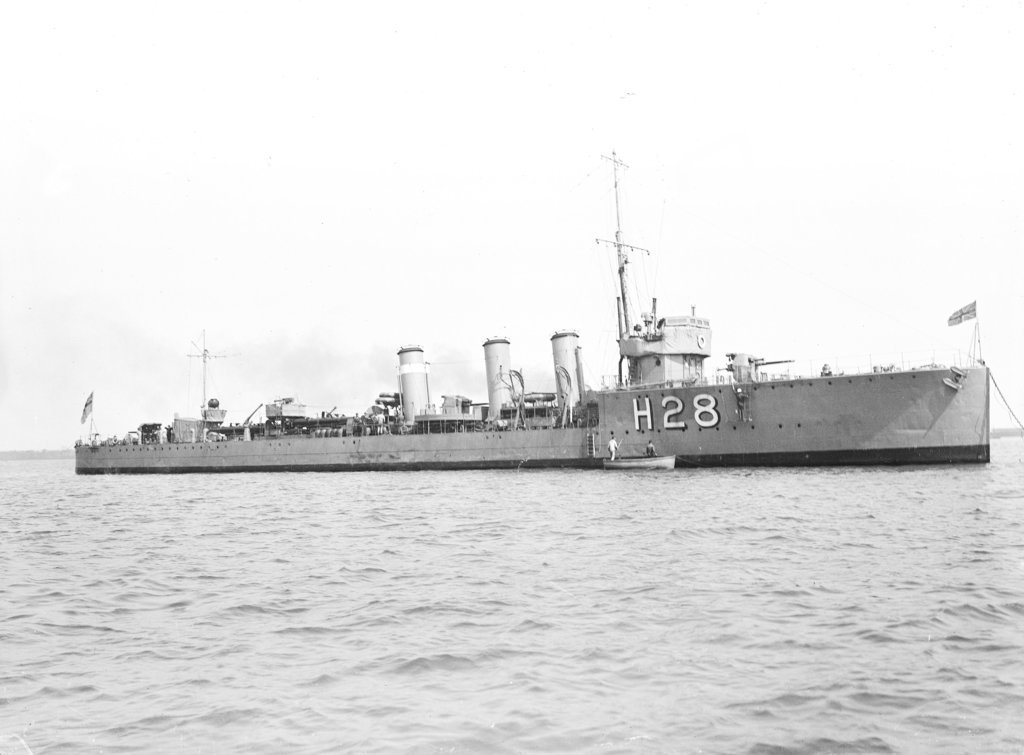
- Sister ship Orpheus

History

United Kingdom
- Name: Nepean
- Namesake: Sir Evan Nepean
- Ordered: November 1914
- Builder: Thornycroft, Woolston, Southampton
- Laid down: February 1915
- Launched: 22 January 1916
- Completed: March 1916
- Out of service: 15 November 1921
- Fate: Sold to be broken up

General characteristics
- Class & type: Admiralty M-class destroyer
- Displacement: 971 long tons (987 t) (normal)
- Length: 273 ft 4 in (83.3 m) (o/a); 265 feet (80.8 m) (p.p.)
- Beam: 26 ft 8 in (8.1 m)
- Draught: 8 ft 11 in (2.7 m)
- Installed power: 3 Yarrow boilers, 25,000 shp (19,000 kW)
- Propulsion: Brown-Curtiss steam turbines, 3 shafts
- Speed: 34 knots (63 km/h; 39 mph)
- Range: 2,530 nmi (4,690 km; 2,910 mi) at 15 kn (28 km/h; 17 mph)
- Complement: 80
- Armament: 3 × single QF 4-inch (102 mm) guns; 2 × single 1-pdr (37 mm (1.5 in)) AA guns; 2 × twin 21 in (533 mm) torpedo tubes

HMS Nepean was a Repeat Admiralty M-class destroyer which served in the Royal Navy during the First World War. The M class was an improvement, capable of higher speed, on those of the preceding L class. The second Royal Navy vessel to be named after Sir Evan Nepean, and the first not in Australian service, the destroyer was launched in 1916 and joined the Thirteenth Destroyer Flotilla of the Grand Fleet. In 1917, Nepean formed part of the escort for the light cruisers Dublin and Sydney, when they were attacked by the Zeppelin L 43, and supported the First Battlecruiser Squadron during the Second Battle of Heligoland Bight. Neither led to the warship being involved in any action with the enemy. The destroyer finished the war with the Fourth Destroyer Flotilla. After the Armistice, Nepean was placed in reserve before being sold to be broken up in 1921.

== Design and development ==
At the start of the First World War, the Royal Navy envisaged heavy destroyer losses and so instigated a War Programme to quickly construct new warships. Nepean was one of the ten Repeat Admiralty M-class destroyers ordered by the British Admiralty in November 1914 as part of the Second War Programme. The M class was an improved version of the earlier L-class, required to reach a higher speed in order to counter rumoured new German fast destroyers. The remit was to have a maximum speed of 36 knots (67 km/h; 41 mph) and, although ultimately the destroyers fell short of that ambition in service, the extra performance that was achieved was valued by the navy. It transpired that the German warships did not exist. The Repeat M class differed from the prewar vessels in having a raked stem.

The destroyer had a length of 265 ft (80.8 m) between perpendiculars and 273 ft 4 in (83.3 m) overall, with a beam of 26 ft 8 in (8.1 m) and draught of 8 ft 11 in (2.7 m). Displacement was 971 long tons (987 t) normal. Power was provided by three Yarrow boilers feeding Brown-Curtiss steam turbines rated at 23,000 shaft horsepower (17,000 kW), driving three shafts and exhausting through three funnels. Design speed was 34 knots (63 km/h; 39 mph). Nepean managed 33.88 knots (62.75 km/h; 38.99 mph) on 22,500 shp (16,800 kW) during trials. A total of 228 long tons (232 t) of oil was carried. Design range was 2,530 nautical miles (4,690 km; 2,910 mi) at 15 knots (28 km/h; 17 mph), but actual endurance in service was less; sister ship Murray had a range of 2,240 nautical miles (4,150 km; 2,580 mi) at 15 knots (28 km/h; 17 mph). The ship had a complement of 80 officers and ratings.

Nepean had a main armament consisting of three single QF 4-inch (102 mm) Mk IV guns on the centreline, with one on the forecastle, one aft on a raised platform and one between the middle and aft funnels. Torpedo armament consisted of two twin torpedo tubes for 21 in (533 mm) torpedoes located aft of the funnels. Fire control included a single Dumaresq and a Vickers range clock. A single 2-pdr 40 mm (1.6 in) "pom-pom" anti-aircraft gun was carried. For anti-submarine warfare, Napier was equipped with two chutes for two depth charges. The number of depth charges carried increased as the war progressed and, by 1918, the vessel was carrying between 30 and 50 depth charges.

== Construction and career ==
Nepean was laid down by John I. Thornycroft & Company at their yard in Woolston, Southampton in February 1915, the first of two destroyers ordered through the Second War Programme from the company. Launched on 22 January the following year, the second of the class to be launched in 1916, the vessel was completed in March. The destroyer was the second ship in the Royal Navy to be named after Sir Evan Nepean, and the first not to be in Australian service. The warship was deployed as part of the Grand Fleet, joining the Thirteenth Destroyer Flotilla. The flotilla was based at the naval base in Rosyth. On 30 May, Nepean was the only member of the flotilla left in the port and did not to sail with the Grand Fleet to confront the German High Seas Fleet in what would be the Battle of Jutland.

On 30 April 1917, off the Isle of May, the destroyer claimed to be the target of a torpedo launched by the German submarine UC-77, which missed, although no record of the attack was reported by the Imperial German Navy. On 3 May, the destroyer formed part of the escort for the light cruisers Dublin and Sydney, along with sister ships Obdurate, Pelican and Pylades, on a routine patrol of the North Sea. During the following day, they were attacked by the Zeppelin L 43. The airship bombed the British ships, causing minor damage to Obdurate but otherwise causing no harm. During the battle, Nepean had identified a torpedo attack from German submarines but was again undamaged.

Increasing activity from submarines against merchant shipping had led to the creation of a convoy system relying on destroyer escorts. The flotilla was called upon to accompany over 26 vessels a day. On 16 October, the destroyer joined with 53 other destroyers and 27 light cruisers in an unsuccessful search for an escorted German minelayer. At the same time, German cruisers attacked a convoy crossing to Scandinavia. The loss of nine merchant ships and three escorts led to the Admiralty increasing the escort to nine M-class destroyers. During the following month, from 16 November, the destroyer formed part of the escort for the First Battlecruiser Squadron, led by Lion, which left Rosyth to attack German minesweepers. Apart from Repulse, the squadron did not take part in the subsequent Second Battle of Heligoland Bight.

In the last months of the war, Nepean was part of the Fourth Destroyer Flotilla based at Devonport. After the Armistice that ended the war, the Royal Navy returned to a peacetime level of strength and both the number of ships and personnel needed to be reduced to save money. The destroyer was transferred to reserve at Nore. However, the harsh conditions of wartime operations, particularly the requirement to run at high speed regardless of the conditions and the poor weather that is typical of the North Sea, exacerbated by the fact that the hull was not galvanised, meant that the ship was soon worn out. Nepean was declared superfluous to operational requirements, retired, and, on 15 November 1921, was sold to Cashmore of Newport, Wales, and broken up in 1923.

== Pendant numbers ==
Pendant number	Date
G18	September 1915
F03	January 1917
HA5	
H44	June 1918
G83	January 1919
H9A	January 1922
