= Action of 4 May 1917 =

Naval and air engagement of the First World War

- Part of First World War
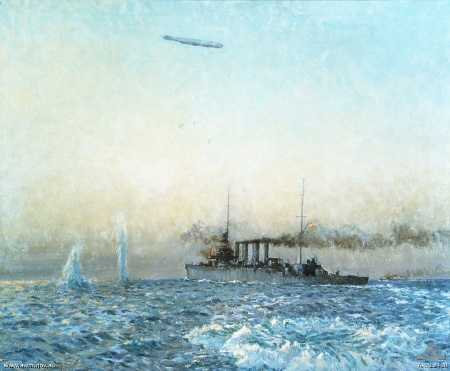
- A painting of the engagement between Australian light cruiser HMAS Sydney and German Zeppelin LZ43 in the North Sea on 4 May 1917.
Date	4 May 1917
Location	North Sea, Atlantic Ocean 56°N 03°E
Result	Indecisive

Belligerents
United Kingdom; Australia	Germany

Commanders and leaders
John Dumaresq	Hermann Kraushaar

Strength
Light cruiser Sydney; Light cruiser Dublin; 4 destroyers	Zeppelin L.43; 2 submarines
- The battle location in the North Sea

The action of 4 May 1917 was a naval and air engagement of the First World War in the North Sea. The action took place between the German Zeppelin LZ 92 (tactical name, L.43), several German submarines and a naval force led by the Australian light cruiser HMAS Sydney. The action was inconclusive with no casualties on either side, concluding when the Zeppelin had dropped all of its bombs and the cruisers had expended all of their anti-aircraft ammunition.

== Prelude ==
Sydney (Commander John Dumaresq) was serving in British waters when on 4 May 1917, while part of an anti-submarine patrol from Rosyth, Scotland, the ship took part in an engagement with a German Zeppelin, L.43 (Kapitänleutnant Hermann Kraushaar). The cruiser HMS Dublin and four destroyers, HMS Obdurate, Nepean, Pelican and Pylades also participated. Sydney was the second-in-command of the 2nd Light Cruiser Squadron, had been patrolling between the Firth of Forth and River Humber, when lookouts spotted a vessel on the surface to the east of the British flotilla and Obdurate was detailed to investigate at around 10:00 a.m. About twenty-five minutes later, the Zeppelin was located by Dublin about 17 nautical miles (31 km; 20 mi) to the east. Sydney and Dublin turned towards the contact and fired at maximum range.

== Action ==
Obdurate continued to investigate the surface contact and found two German submarines. Coming under attack from one of these submarines, the destroyer dropped depth charges before turning away to attack the Zeppelin. As the destroyer closed on it, the Zeppelin turned away to the south-east. Over the next half-hour, Dublin was attacked by the German submarines at least three times with torpedoes, leading Dumaresq to conclude that the Germans were attempting to spring a trap on the British vessels. He ordered Obdurate to complete its investigation of the suspect vessel, which was found to be a Dutch fishing vessel.

Dumaresq tried to draw the aircraft into following the British force by ordering his ships to turn back onto their original course. As the airship approached , Dublin and Sydney turned about to attack. The Zeppelin commander began a high-altitude bombing run on Dublin but rapid changes of direction by the cruisers frustrated these efforts and the Zeppelin attacked Obdurate, dropping three bombs which achieved near misses. This was followed by a further attack on Sydney, with between ten and twelve bombs being dropped and missing due to the cruiser's evasive manoeuvres. Sydney returned fire with her anti-aircraft guns but the aircraft proved to be flying too high to be hit.

Another Zeppelin moved towards the engagement at around 1:00 p.m., having been contacted by L.43 for assistance but it loitered to the north-east and did not attack. The engagement ended when both sides exhausted their ammunition at around 2:30 p.m. The Zeppelin was forced to remain high to stay out of range of the anti-aircraft fire, this meant that the bombs were dropped from too great of height to strike the Allied patrol. There was no damage or casualties. After the action, the Zeppelins departed and the British vessels completed their patrol before returning to Rosyth.

== Aftermath ==
The action was commemorated in the early 1930s, in an oil painting by Australian war artist Charles Bryant. It was the first time that a Royal Australian Navy vessel had been attacked by an aircraft and was one of the actions that resulted in Sydney being awarded the "North Sea 1916–18" battle honour.

== Bibliography ==
- Coulthard-Clark, Chris (1998). The Encyclopaedia of Australia's Battles (1st ed.). Sydney, New South Wales: Allen & Unwin. pp. 128–129. ISBN 1-86448-611-2.
- Jose, A. W. (1941) [1928]. "Chapter 10 Service in European Waters" (PDF). The Royal Australian Navy, 1914–1918. Official History of Australia in the War of 1914–1918. Vol. IX (9th ed.). Sydney, New South Wales: Angus and Robertson. pp. 294–297. OCLC 7466152. Archived from the original on 12 July 2015.
- Odgers, George (1994). Diggers: The Australian Army, Navy and Air Force in Eleven Wars: From 1860 to 5 June 1944. Vol. I. Sydney, New South Wales: Lansdowne. ISBN 978-1-86302-385-6.
