= John Glossop =

Royal Navy admiral (1871–1934)

Vice-Admiral John Glossop CB
- Born: 23 October 1871; Twickenham, Middlesex
- Died: 23 December 1934 (aged 63); Weymouth, Dorset
- Military career
- Allegiance: United Kingdom
- Branch: Royal Navy
- Service years: 1884–1921
- Rank: Vice-Admiral
- Commands: HMAS Sydney (1913–17); HMS Prometheus (1908–11); HMS Lizard (1902–04)
- Conflicts: First World War; Asian and Pacific theatre; Battle of Bita Paka; Battle of Cocos
- Awards: Companion of the Order of the Bath; Mentioned in Despatches; Order of the Rising Sun (Japan); Legion of Honour (France)

Vice-Admiral John Collings Taswell Glossop, CB (23 October 1871 – 23 December 1934) was a British Royal Navy officer best known for captaining the Australian cruiser HMAS Sydney during the Battle of Cocos in which the German cruiser SMS Emden was sunk.

== Naval career ==
Passing out of HMS Britannia in 1887, he served for a short time in the Channel Fleet. His lifelong association with Australia began in 1888 when he arrived as a Midshipman in HMS Orlando (1886), flagship of the Australian Squadron. He was then transferred to HMS Calliope (1884), Calypso-class corvette and to HMS Egeria (1873), Fantome class, both serving in the Pacific. Promoted sub lieutenant in 1891 and lieutenant in 1893, he specialised in navigation, returning to the Australia Station in 1896 as Navigating Officer of HMS Royalist (1883), a Satellite-class sloop. Glossop returned to England in 1900 and after two years as an instructor in Britannia.

He was given his first command, HMS Lizard (1886) Bramble-class gunboat, in June 1902. This gunboat had only a short commission in Australian and New Zealand waters before being sold in 1904. Promoted commander in June 1904, he was appointed Drafting Commander at the Royal Naval Barracks, Chatham. He returned to Australia in 1909 in command of HMS Prometheus (1898), a Pelorus-class protected cruiser. Much of the next two years was spent among the Pacific islands. From Prometheus, he returned to England and was promoted captain in June 1911. Officially reported by the Australian Naval Representative in London as being "anxious to command a ship of the RAN" and "in entire sympathy with the Australian Navy movement", he was given command of a new light cruiser, the Town class HMAS Sydney (1912), in June 1913; he had held the RAN rank of captain since March.

In the First World War, Glossop commanded Sydney during the 9 November 1914 Battle of Cocos, defeating the German light cruiser SMS Emden in a one-on-one engagement and forcing her to ground herself. Glossop gave a detailed account of the fight to the Australian war correspondent A.B. Paterson in Columbo shortly after the encounter. HMAS Sydney sailed for Australia in company with the new flagship, HMAS Australia (1911), an Indefatigable-class battlecruiser, and received a tumultuous welcome on arrival in Sydney.

On 9 February 1917, he was relieved by Captain JS Dumaresq and sailed for Australia to take up the three-year appointment of Captain-in-Charge of Naval Establishments, Sydney. Glossop was promoted to commodore 2nd class on 1 March 1919 and in June presided over the controversial court-martial of mutineers of HMAS Australia. The severity of the sentences caused a political uproar, and he was attacked in the federal parliament. He was defended by the acting Navy Minister, but the affair may have contributed to his failure to be appointed Australian Naval Representative in London, a post for which he was recommended by the Naval Board. He reverted to the RN in October 1920, and after a short period as coast guard captain at Queenstown, Ireland, was promoted rear admiral on 20 November 1921 and retired next day. He became a vice admiral on the retired list in 1926.

He was appointed a Companion of the Order of the Bath in the 1915 New Year Honours.
