= John Saumarez Dumaresq =

Royal Navy officer (1873–1922)

Rear-Admiral John Dumaresq CB CVO
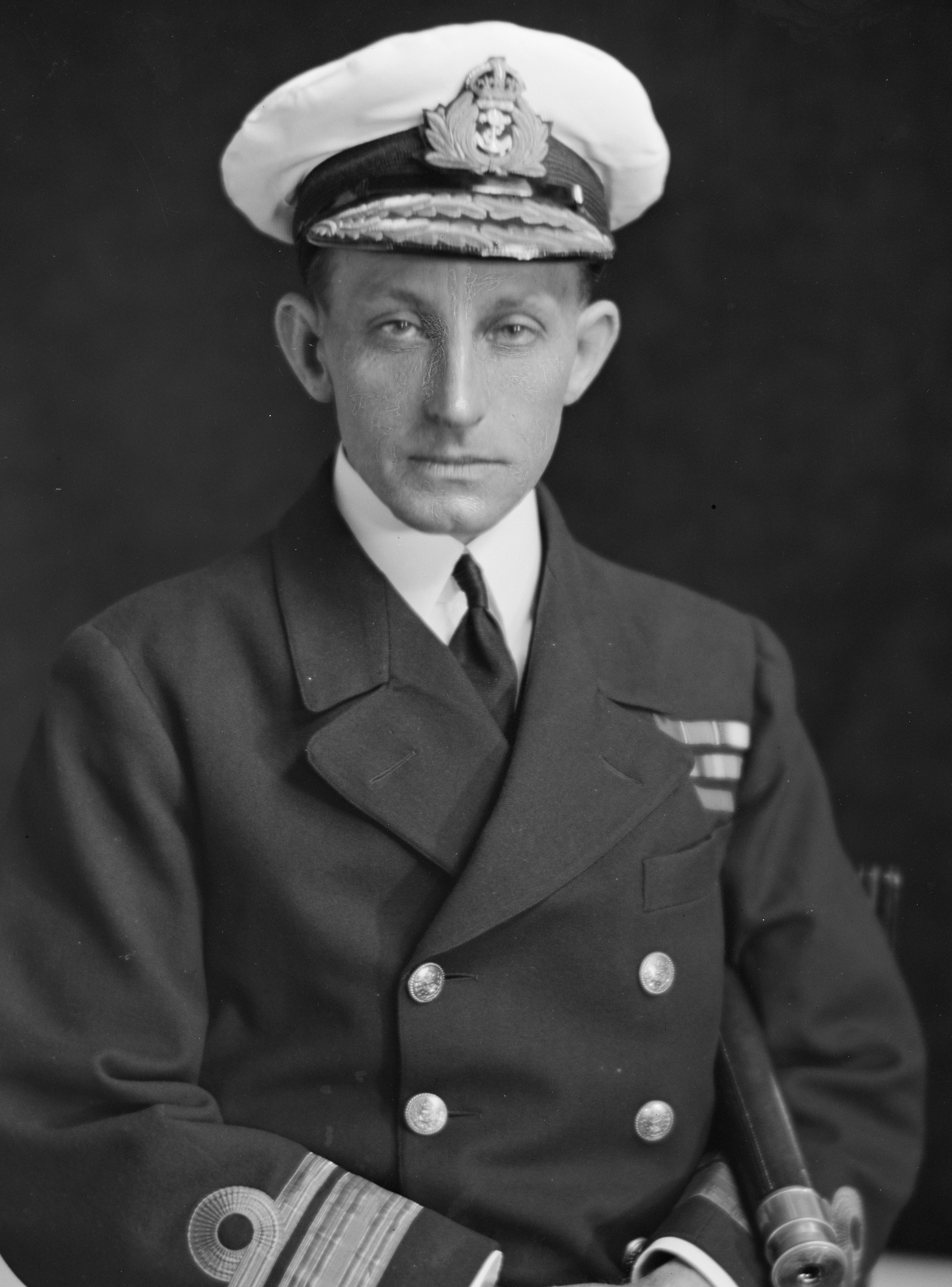
- Rear Admiral John Dumaresq, 1922
- Born: 26 October 1873; Sydney, Australia
- Died: 22 July 1922 (aged 48); Manila, Philippines
- Burial place: Manila Memorial Park – Sucat, Paranaque, Philippines
- Military career
- Allegiance: United Kingdom
- Branch: Royal Navy
- Service years: 1886–1922
- Rank: Rear-Admiral
- Commands: HM Australian Fleet (1919–22); HMAS Sydney (1917–19); HMS Repulse (1917); HMS Shannon (1913–17); HMS Prince of Wales (1912–13); HMS Swift (1910); HMS Nith (1908–10)
- Conflicts: First World War: War at Sea; Battle of Jutland; Action of 4 May 1917; Second Battle of Heligoland Bight
- Awards: Companion of the Order of the Bath; Commander of the Royal Victorian Order; Order of Saint Catherine (Russia)

Rear-Admiral John Saumarez Dumaresq, CB, CVO (/dʊˈmɛrɪk/ duu-MERR-ik; 26 October 1873 – 22 July 1922) was an officer in the Royal Navy. He served during the First World War but is most remembered as an inventor, for development of the device named after him, the Dumaresq, which helped users calculate the rate at which the range to an enemy ship was changing over time. He was the first Australian born officer to command the Australian Fleet.

== Early life ==
Dumaresq was the grandson of a British colonial settler, William Dumaresq, who had migrated to Australia, in 1825, accompanying the Governor of New South Wales, Ralph Darling, who was married to his sister, Eliza.

He was born at Rose Bay, New South Wales, but left Australia as an infant. In 1907, he married Christian Elizabeth Louisa Dalrymple.

== Naval career ==
Dumaresq lived in England from age two and became a naval cadet at HMS Britannia in 1886. He became interested in torpedoes and gunnery and introduced a number of innovations. In 1904 he was promoted to commander. In 1908 he commanded a flotilla escorting King Edward VII on a tour of Russia and was appointed a Member of the Royal Victorian Order from the King and awarded the Order of Saint Catherine from the Tsar. On 30 June 1910 he was promoted to captain, then underwent courses at Portsmouth.

In 1913, Dumaresq became captain of HMS Shannon and took part in the Battle of Jutland. He was appointed a Companion of the Order of the Bath for his part in the battle

In February 1917, Dumaresq was appointed commanding officer of HMAS Sydney, which was serving as part of the Grand Fleet in the North Sea. Shortly afterwards, the ship and its accompanying patrol were attacked by a Zeppelin. Dumaresq attempted to trap the Zeppelin by ordering the accompanying ships to disperse, leaving the Zeppelin attempting to bomb his ship and coming closer, and then ordering them back forming a ring surrounding the enemy. The Zeppelin remained too high, meaning the ships' anti-aircraft guns could not reach it, but also the Zeppelin could not aim reliably enough to drop bombs on the ships below.

Dumaresq became convinced of the need for aircraft to operate from ships and a platform to his design was installed on Sydney in October 1917 for the purpose of launching an aeroplane. During an engagement with enemy destroyers at Heligoland Bight on 1 June 1918, the aircraft was used in action to drive off two attacking German aeroplanes, shooting down one.

Dumaresq was appointed Commodore Commanding the Australian Fleet on 22 March 1919, as the first Australian born officer to do so. His flagship then became HMAS Australia. Ships of the Australian navy had been distributed around the world during the war, but now returned to Australian waters based at Sydney. His period of command was marked by disagreement with the Australian government over expenditure upon the navy. In 1920 he was advanced to Commander of the Royal Victorian Order and in June 1921 was promoted to rear admiral.

In April 1922, Dumaresq was posted back to the Royal Navy. On the return journey he contracted pneumonia, and died in the US Military Hospital in Manila on 22 July.

He was originally buried at the Protestant Cemetery for British citizens in Makati City. His remains, along with those of other British nationals, were transferred to a common grave in the Manila North Cemetery. The remains were later transferred to Manila Memorial Park – Sucat, Paranaque, Philippines, where a memorial marker was installed in his honor.

Military offices
Preceded by Rear Admiral Sir Lionel Halsey	Rear Admiral Commanding HM Australian Fleet; 1919–1922	Succeeded by Rear Admiral Albert Addison
