= RMS Empress of Russia =

Ocean liner

- Empress of Russia

History

Canada
- Name: Empress of Russia
- Owner: Canadian Pacific Railway
- Operator: Canadian Pacific Steamship Company
- Port of registry: Vancouver
- Route: Vancouver – Hong Kong
- Builder: Fairfield Shipbuilding & Engineering Company, Govan
- Yard number: 484
- Launched: 28 August 1912
- Completed: March 1913
- Maiden voyage: 1 April 1913
- Identification: Official number: 135197; Code letters JBSQ (until 1933); Call sign VGKW (1934 onward)
- Fate: Scrapped 1945, Barrow

General characteristics
- Type: Ocean liner
- Tonnage: 16,810 GRT; tonnage under deck 12,557; 8,789 NRT
- Length: 570 ft (173.7 m)
- Beam: 68 ft (20.7 m)
- Installed power: 8,720 NHP
- Propulsion: Coal-fired boilers, steam turbines, quadruple screws
- Speed: 19 knots (35 km/h; 22 mph)
- Capacity: 284 1st class passengers; 100 2nd class passengers; up to 800 steerage passengers
- Notes: sister ship: Empress of Asia

RMS Empress of Russia was a steam turbine ocean liner built in 1912–13 by Fairfield Shipbuilding & Engineering Company at Govan on the Clyde in Scotland for Canadian Pacific steamships (CP). She regularly worked the trans-Pacific route between Canada and the Far East.

== History ==
Fairfield Shipbuilding & Engineering Company built the ship at Govan near Glasgow in Scotland. Empress of Russia was launched on 28 August 1912 and completed in March 1913.

She left Liverpool on 1 April 1913 on her maiden voyage via Suez to Hong Kong and Vancouver. Thereafter, she regularly sailed back and forth along the Hong Kong – Shanghai – Nagasaki – Kobe – Yokohama – Vancouver route. In 1913 she broke the record for the fastest trans-Pacific crossing which was formerly held by RMS Empress of Japan; but her sister ship, RMS Empress of Asia broke that record in May 1914, crossing the Pacific in nine days, two hours, and fifteen minutes. The popularity of the short route from Vancouver to the Orient was so great that these two additional CP Empress ocean liners were necessary.

The 16,810 GRT vessel had a length of 570 feet (173.7 m), and her beam was 68 feet (20.7 m). She had three funnels and two masts. Her four steam turbines drove four screws, giving her a cruising speed of 19 knots (35 km/h). The ocean liner provided accommodation for 284 first-class passengers and for 100 second class passengers. There was also room for up to 800 steerage-class passengers. This was the first liner to have a straight stern like a warship; and the advantages of this type of stern were revealed in terms of speed, vibration, steering and seagoing qualities.

Empress of Russia's UK official number was 135197 and until 1933 her code letters were JBSQ. In 1934 her code letters were superseded by the call sign VGKW.

== World War I ==
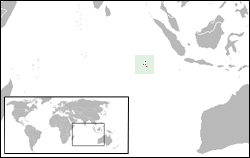
After the Battle of Cocos, Empress of Russia met HMAS Sydney in waters of the Keelings and Cocos islands, which are located in the Indian Ocean east of Sumatra; and Empress of Russia took aboard prisoners who survived the destruction of the German raider, SMS Emden

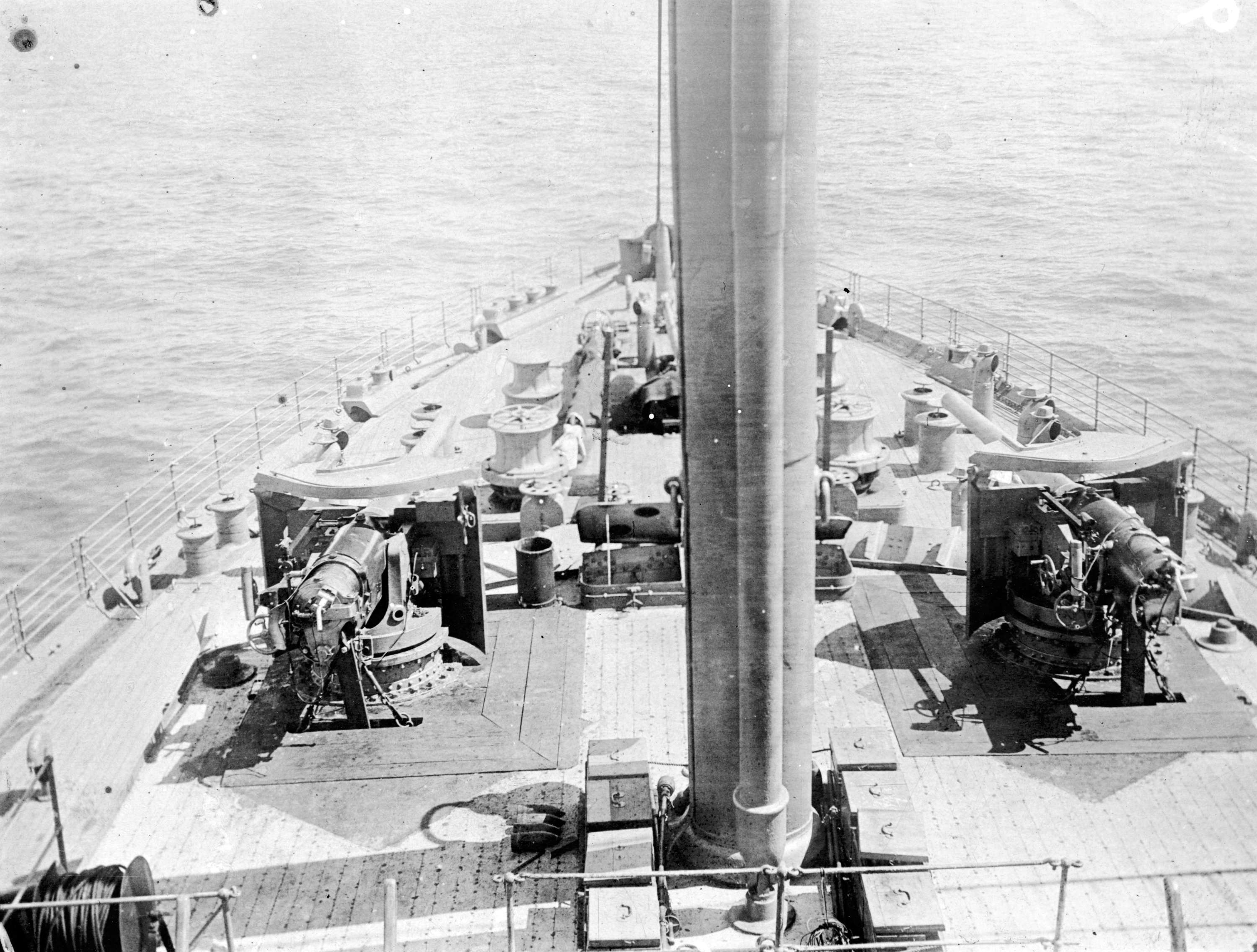
Forward QF 4.7-inch guns

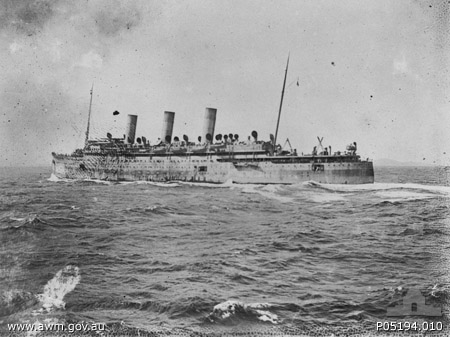
As an armed merchant cruiser in the Red Sea, photographed by a crewman aboard the troop transport HMAT Armadale

Empress of Russia was requisitioned by the British Admiralty twice during the First World War. Initially, the ship was refitted as an armed merchant cruiser at Hong Kong; she was attached to a squadron blockading German merchant shipping in Philippine waters and retained her Chinese crew, but took on French sailors to man her guns. Later, she was transferred to the Indian Ocean.

In November 1914, the highlight of this Indian Ocean tour of duty followed from a rendezvous at sea with the Australian cruiser HMAS Sydney. In what was called the Battle of Cocos, Sydney had engaged the German cruiser SMS Emden, forcing the raider to beach herself on North Keeling Island to avoid sinking. Some 230 Emden survivors were transferred from Sydney to Empress of Russia for transport to Colombo. At this point, Empress of Russia was sailing in a convoy of troop ships carrying 30,000 ANZACs from Albany, Australia to Suez and Europe.

On April 30, 1915, Empress of Russia sailed from Hong Kong to the Red Sea, where she served until October 1915.

In one incident, the guns of Empress of Russia were brought to bear on Hodeidah in what is modern Yemen. Bluntly, the Turks were told that if British and French consuls, who had been kidnapped, were not brought back, the port city would be demolished.

Shortly afterwards, Empress of Russia was released by the Admiralty for a return to civilian service. The ship was refitted at Hong Kong, arriving there on 19 October, going into dock on 25 October and finally paying off on 12 February 1916. Empress of Russia then returned to her familiar trans-Pacific route. Amongst those sailing with Empress of Russia in this period was Sumner Welles, who was to become one of President Franklin Roosevelt's foreign policy advisers.

In April 1917 Empress of Russia brought 2,056 members of the Chinese Labor Corps (CLC) from Weihaiwei in China across the Pacific to Williams Head on Vancouver Island. After quarantine the CLC were then transshipped to Port Moody on the Canadian mainland and transported by the Canadian Pacific Railway in guarded cattle trucks across Canada to the Atlantic Coast, where other Empress ships took them to Dunkirk.

The British Admiralty called Empress of Russia to wartime service for a second time in early 1918. She was to be used in transporting American troops to Europe.

Empress of Russia's last wartime voyage began from Liverpool on 12 January 1919. She sailed to Le Havre where Chinese labor battalions boarded Empress of Russia for the return voyage via Suez to Hong Kong. From the Far East, she sailed across the Pacific to Vancouver for re-fitting.

This ship remained a coal-burner after the Great War, even though many liners at that time were being converted to oil.

== Between the wars ==
Between the wars, Empress of Russia resumed regular trans-Pacific crossings. Her first post-war voyage began on 10 April 1919; and the pre-war route was somewhat modified on this trip. On this occasion, she sailed from Vancouver to Manila outward bound; and she stopped at Vladivostok on the return voyage to North America from the Far East to pick up Canadian soldiers who had served at part of the Canadian Siberian Expeditionary Force during the Russian Revolution. In this period, Empress of Russia transported Philippine Senator Manuel L. Quezon on his return to Manila from the first Independence Mission to the US Congress in 1919. These trans-Pacific sailings continued up through December 1940.

The routine nature of her schedule did nothing to diminish public interest in the comings and goings of Empress of Russia. For example, The New York Times regularly published news of mail ships sailings. In an era when airplanes carrying mail was still relatively novel, for example, the newspaper published a regular "Shipping and Mails" column. In a 1938 edition, the Times reported:

Letter mail and printed matter for China, Brunei, Dutch East Indies (including Sumatra), French Indo-China, Hong Kong, Japan, Korea, Labuan, Malay States, North Borneo, Philippine islands, Sarawak and Straits Settlements and printed matter for Siam via Yokohama. 27 April. Shanghai 2 May. Hong Kong 5 May and Manila 7 May. Parcel Post for China, French Indo-China, Hong Kong, Japan, Korea and Siam. Air mail closes G.P.O 10 P.M. 14 April.

— The New York Times,

During this peacetime period, she completed 310 crossings. Amongst the famous passengers who traveled on Empress of Russia were Chinese Nationalist leaders Sun Yat-sen and Chiang Kai-shek, who sailed from Hong Kong to Shanghai in 1922; and American humorist Will Rogers who sailed to Japan in late-November 1932.

== World War II ==
Empress of Russia was again commissioned by the British Admiralty as a troop transport. Initially, she carried Australian and New Zealand Air Force recruits to Canada for flight school training. In March 1941, she was refitted at dockyards on the River Clyde in Scotland.

The captain of Empress of Russia in 1941–42 would only realize many years later that he had had a VIP aboard — a young Midshipman Philip Mountbatten (later to become Duke of Edinburgh) is remembered for having helped stoke the boilers in 1941.

Empress of Russia was involved in the North Africa landings in 1943. In October 1943, she made a special trip to Gothenburg to exchange prisoners of war. This was followed by seven trips to Reykjavík for the RAF.

In early 1944, she was used as an accommodation ship at Rosyth for Russian crews who were to take over a number of British warships. In June, she was moved to Spithead where she was used as a depot ship for tugs after the D-Day landings.

In October 1944, she sailed to Gareloch where she was laid up until June 1945. Work was begun on the refitting Empress of Russia for service transporting Canadian troops from Europe to North America; however, she was gutted by fire on 8 September 1945 at Barrow. The extensive damage caused the ship to be scrapped; and she was broken up by Thos. W. Ward.

== See also ==
- CP Ships
- List of ocean liners
- List of ships in British Columbia
