= Albert Charles Scott =

Royal Navy officer

Vice-Admiral Albert Charles Scott CBE
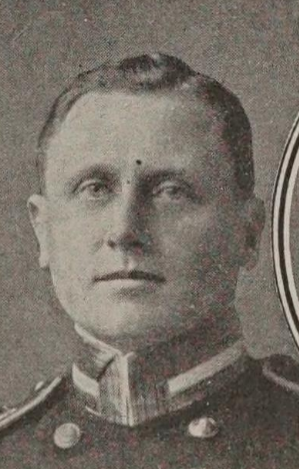
- Scott as a captain
- Born: 1 February 1872
- Died: 16 March 1969 (aged 97)
- Military career
- Allegiance: United Kingdom
- Branch: Royal Navy
- Rank: Vice-admiral
- Commands: HMS Martin; HMS Blonde; HMS Dublin
- Conflicts: First World War; Battle of Jutland

Vice-Admiral Albert Charles Scott CBE (1 February 1872 – 16 March 1969), was a British Royal Navy officer during World War I.

Scott was born in 1872 and was educated at Burgoyne House Academy. He subsequently entered the Royal Navy.

He served in the cruiser HMS Raleigh, the flagship of the Cape Squadron, between January 1889 and October 1890, and in the cruiser HMS Calypso from December 1890 to November 1891. The Calypso was principally in home waters but also made cruises to the West Indies and Norway. On 4 September 1902 he was appointed in command of the training brig HMS Martin. Scott was made captain on 31 December 1911. From October 1914 until March 1916, he commanded the light cruiser HMS Blonde, which was attached to the 4th Battle Squadron of the Grand Fleet and moved to command HMS Dublin as part of the 2nd Light Cruiser Squadron between March and December 1916. He commanded Dublin in the Battle of Jutland.

In 1918 Scott was appointed a Commander of the Order of the British Empire. He retired from the navy as a vice-admiral and died on 16 March 1969.

He was the cousin of the Antarctic explorer Robert Falcon Scott.
