= Raja Laut =

Two masted gaff rigged wooden schooner, built in 2006

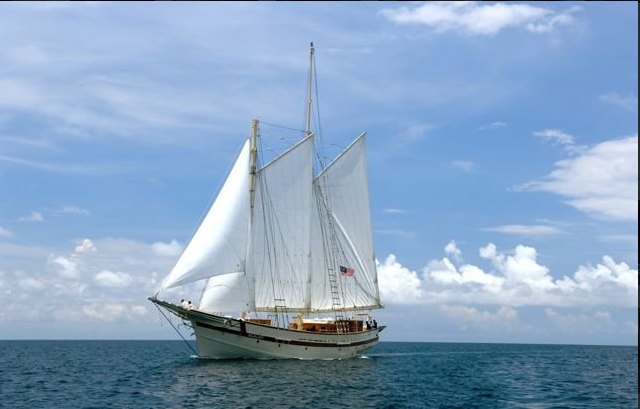

History
- Launched: 2006

General characteristics
- Displacement: 150 tons
- Length: 31 m (102 ft)
- Beam: 7.2 m (24 ft)
- Installed power: Yanmar 300 hp (220 kW)
- Sail plan: Gaff rig schooner
- Speed: 12 knots (22 km/h; 14 mph) (sail); 10 knots (19 km/h; 12 mph) (power)

Raja Laut is a two masted gaff rigged wooden schooner. Built in 2006, her hull and rigging are based on the designs of traditional European yachts and small trading ships of the 19th century.

== Design ==
The hull design is typical of traditional wooden schooners from Europe and America. The hull of Raja Laut was built of hard and resistant timber, a type of ironwood known as Belian or Ulin, forming a strong and watertight hull, with all fastening in '304' stainless steel. Emphasis on timber quality and symmetry of construction mean the hull lines provide for a smooth flow of water and excellent stability.

=== Name ===
The Malay name Raja Laut, translates to "King of the Sea", is a reference to the history and maritime adventure stories of Joseph Conrad and the Malay Archipelago, South East Asia.

== Luxury charter ==
Raja Laut is part of a number of sail charters that operates around the Asia-Pacific region. The vessel has only six cabins, with a maximum of 12 passengers. In January 2011, Raja Laut was involved in a more unusual charter when she was hired as one of the sets for the making of a feature film about 50 German World War One marines left stranded by the light cruiser SMS Emden during the Battle of Cocos. The Schooner Ayesha owned by Clunies-Ross of Cocos Keeling Islands was the vessel which Mücke had used to sail with his men to return to Germany.

The 2012 feature film, The Men of Emden, the Ayesha is portrayed by the schooner Raja Laut. The film was being made by the veteran filmmaker Berengar Pfahl.

== See also ==
- List of schooners
