= Battle of Cocos =

1914 naval battle between Australia and Germany near the Cocos (Keeling) Islands

Coordinates: 11°50′S 96°49′E

- Part of World War I
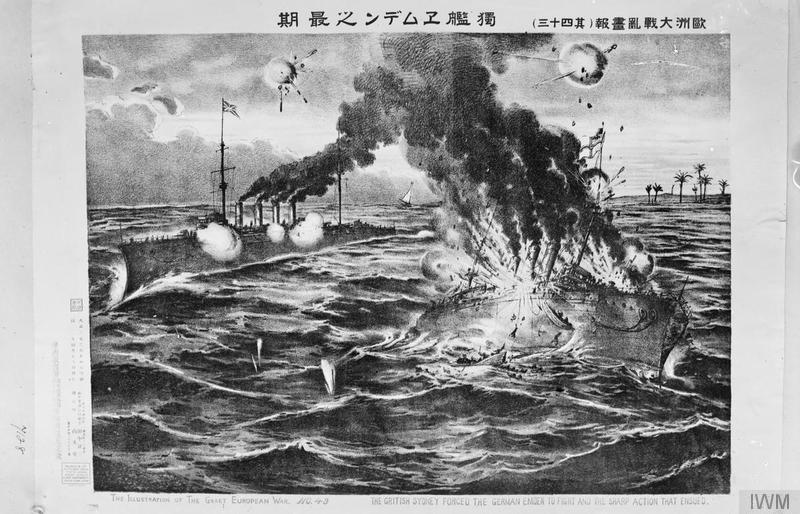
- Japanese poster depicting the Battle of Cocos
Date	9 November 1914
Location	Off the Keeling Islands, Indian Ocean
Result	Australian victory

Belligerents
Australia	Germany

Commanders and leaders
(Australia) John Glossop	(German Empire) Karl von Müller

Strength
Light cruiser Sydney	Light cruiser Emden; Collier Buresk

Casualties and losses
4 killed 16 wounded Sydney damaged	134 killed 69 wounded 157 captured Emden wrecked Buresk scuttled

The Battle of Cocos was a single-ship action that occurred on 9 November 1914, after the Australian light cruiser HMAS Sydney, under the command of John Glossop, responded to an attack on a communications station at Direction Island by the German light cruiser SMS Emden, commanded by Karl von Müller.

After the retreat of the German East Asia Squadron from Southeast Asia, Emden had remained behind to function as a commerce raider. During a two-month period, the German cruiser captured or sank 25 civilian vessels, shelled Madras, and destroyed two Allied warships at Penang. In early November, von Müller decided to attack the communications station at Direction Island, in the Cocos (Keeling) Islands, to hamper Allied communications and frustrate the search for his ship. Around the same time, a convoy of Europe-bound transports carrying Australian and New Zealand soldiers departed from Albany, Western Australia, with escorts HMAS Melbourne, HMAS Sydney, HMS Minotaur, and the Japanese battlecruiser Ibuki.

During the night of 8–9 November, Emden reached the islands and sent a party ashore at around 06:00 to disable the wireless and cable transmission station on Direction Island. The station was able to transmit a distress call before it was shut down. Melbourne received the message and ordered Sydney to investigate. The Australian ship arrived off Direction Island at 09:15, spotting and being spotted by Emden; both ships prepared for combat. Emden opened fire at 09:40, surprising those aboard Sydney as the range was greater than British intelligence thought Emden was capable of. The German ship scored several hits, but was unable to inflict disabling damage to the Australian cruiser before Sydney opened up with her more powerful main guns. After one and one-half hours of fighting, the Emden was heavily damaged and von Müller ordered her beached on North Keeling Island. The Australian warship broke off to pursue the collier Buresk, which scuttled herself, then returned to North Keeling Island at 16:00. At this point, Emden's battle ensign was still flying, and after no response to instructions to lower the ensign, Glossop ordered two salvoes shot into the beached cruiser. Sydney had orders to ascertain the status of the transmission station, but returned the next day to provide medical assistance to the Germans.

Of Emden's crew, 134 were killed and 69 wounded, compared to 4 killed and 16 wounded aboard Sydney. The German survivors were taken aboard the Australian cruiser, with most transferred to the auxiliary cruiser Empress of Russia on 12 November. Sydney rejoined the troop convoy in Colombo, then spent the rest of the war assigned to the North America and West Indies Station, then the British Grand Fleet. Von Müller and some of his officers were imprisoned on Malta, with the rest of the crew being sent to prisoner-of-war camps in Australia. The 50 men of the German shore party on Direction Island commandeered the schooner Ayesha and escaped, eventually reaching Constantinople by land. The defeat of the last German ship in the region allowed RAN warships to be deployed to other theatres, and troopships were able to sail unescorted between Australia and the Middle East until renewed raider activity in 1917.

== Ships ==
=== HMAS Sydney ===
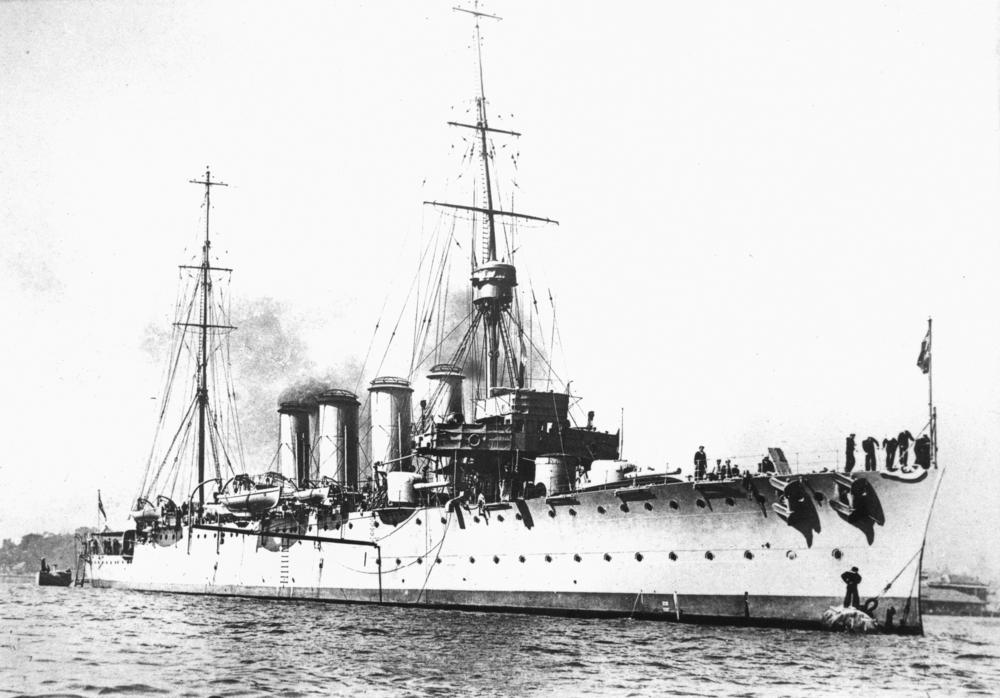
HMAS Sydney

Sydney was a Town-class light cruiser of the Chatham subclass. She had a standard displacement of 5,400 long tons (5,500 t). The cruiser was 456 feet 9.75 inches (139.2 m) long overall and 430 feet (130 m) long between perpendiculars, with a beam of 49 feet 10 inches (15.19 m), and a draught of 19 feet 8 inches (5.99 m). A combined coal- and oil-fuelled boiler system allowed the ship to reach speeds over 25 knots (46 km/h; 29 mph).

The cruiser's main armament consisted of eight BL 6-inch Mark XI guns in single mountings, firing 100-pound (45 kg) shells. Secondary and anti-aircraft armament consisted of a single 3-inch quick-firing high-angle anti-aircraft gun and ten 0.303-inch machine guns (eight Lewis guns and two Maxim guns). Two 21-inch torpedo tubes were fitted, with a payload of seven torpedoes carried. Two hydraulic-release depth charge chutes were carried for anti-submarine warfare. A single 12-pounder 8 cwt field gun and four 3-pounder Hotchkiss saluting guns rounded out the armament.

Sydney was laid down by the London and Glasgow Engineering and Iron Shipbuilding Company at Glasgow, Scotland, on 11 February 1911. The ship was launched on 29 August 1912 by the wife of Admiral Sir Reginald Henderson. Sydney was completed on 26 June 1913, and commissioned into the RAN that day. At the time of the battle, Captain John Glossop was in command, with 434 personnel aboard.

=== SMS Emden ===
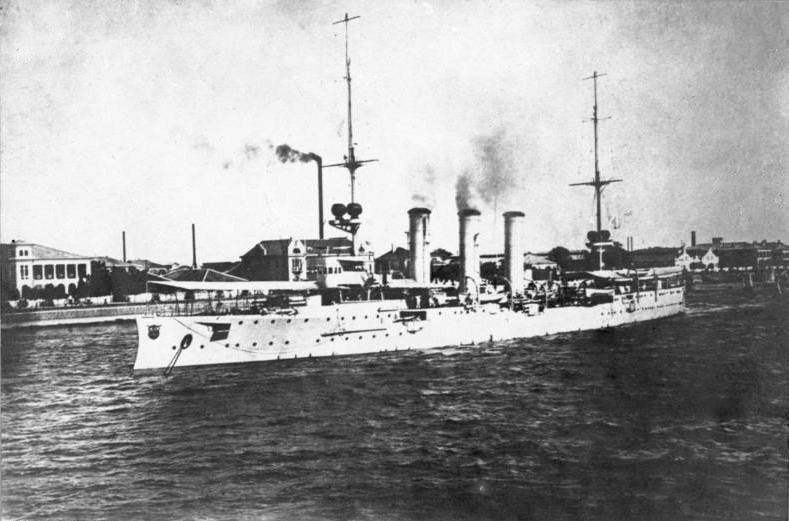
SMS Emden at Tsingtao in 1914

Emden was a Dresden-class cruiser. The ship had a displacement of 3,364 tons at normal load, was 118 metres (387 ft) long, had a beam of 13.4 metres (44 ft), and a draught of 5.3 metres (17 ft). The light cruiser had a maximum speed of 24.5 knots (45.4 km/h; 28.2 mph). The ship was armed with ten 10.5 cm (4.1 in) SK L/40 guns in single mountings, and carried two torpedo tubes.

Emden was built in Danzig by Kaiserliche Werft Danzig. The ship was laid down on 6 April 1906, launched on 26 May 1908, and commissioned on 10 July 1909. At the time of the battle, the cruiser was under the command of Karl von Müller, with 316 aboard.

== Background and leadup ==
Prior to World War I, Emden was operating as part of the German East Asia Squadron. Shortly after the war began, the threat of the Australian battlecruiser HMAS Australia, plus the likelihood that Japan would join the Allies, prompted the German squadron to head into the Pacific Ocean, as the first stage of a retreat to Germany. Unlike the rest of the force, Emden, on von Müller's suggestion, was ordered to head into the Indian Ocean and commence a raiding campaign, as she was the most modern vessel in the East Asia Squadron. Over the next two months, the German ship captured or sank 25 civilian vessels, shelled Madras, and destroyed Russian protected cruiser Zhemchug and French destroyer Mousquet at Penang. During these two months, none of Emden's personnel were killed. At some point during the deployment, a fake fourth funnel was erected to disguise Emden as a British cruiser, specifically HMS Yarmouth. Military historian George Odgers described Emden's activities as "one of the most daring careers of maritime destruction in naval history". Aware of the increasing efforts to find his ship, von Müller selected the wireless station at Direction Island as his next target, with the hope that, in addition to hampering communications between Australia and the United Kingdom, disabling it would frustrate efforts to coordinate the search for Emden (which by this point included sixteen warships from five Allied nations), and direct them away from the Aden–India shipping route, which was where he intended Emden to operate next. She was being supported by Buresk, a British collier that had been captured on 27 September. Although operating independently at the time under a prize crew, Emden had arranged to transmit a signal summoning the collier to the Cocos Islands, allowing the cruiser to refuel before heading west.

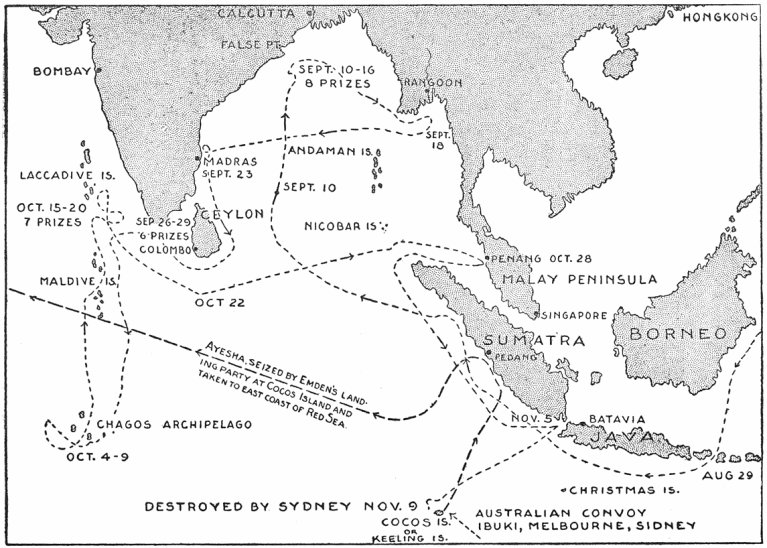
A map showing Emden's route while operating as a commerce raider. The map erroneously states that Ayesha sailed to the Red Sea.

In October 1914, Sydney and sister ship HMAS Melbourne were assigned to escort the first convoy of Australian and New Zealand soldiers heading for Egypt. Originally, the Japanese armoured cruiser Nisshin was to be part of the convoy force, but she ran aground on 12 October, and Sydney was assigned instead. The two cruisers sailed to Albany, Western Australia, where they met the 36-ship convoy and the other two escorts, British armoured cruiser HMS Minotaur and Japanese battlecruiser Ibuki. Sydney, Melbourne, Minotaur, and the 36 merchant ships departed from Albany on 1 November, heading for Colombo; Ibuki had diverted to Fremantle to collect another two transports, and caught up two days later. On 8 November, Minotaur left the convoy with orders to support operations against German South-West Africa, as the destruction of the South Atlantic Squadron at the Battle of Coronel left both the expedition and the Union of South Africa exposed to naval attack. After the cruiser's departure, Melbourne was assigned as lead ship of the convoy.

== Battle ==
=== Wireless station capture ===
During the night of 8–9 November, Emden sailed to Direction Island. At 06:00 on 9 November, the ship anchored in the Cocos lagoon, deployed a steam pinnace (to tow a 50-strong landing party in two boats, led by Emden's first officer, Hellmuth von Mücke, ashore), and transmitted the coded summons for Buresk. The ship was spotted by off-duty personnel at the cable and wireless station, and although the ship was initially suspected to be Minotaur, the station's medical officer observed that the foremost funnel was false, and informed superintendent Darcy Farrant that it may be Emden in the bay. Farrant ordered the telegraphist on duty (already alerted by the German's coded signal) to begin transmitting a distress call by wireless and cable. Emden was able to jam the wireless signal shortly after it began, while the cable distress call continued until an armed party burst into the transmission room. Minotaur heard the wireless call and acknowledged, but von Müller was unconcerned, as the signal strength indicated that Minotaur was at least 10 hours away. Von Mücke instructed Farrant to surrender the keys to the station's buildings and any weapons, which the superintendent handed over, along with news that the Kaiser had announced awards for Emden's actions at Penang.

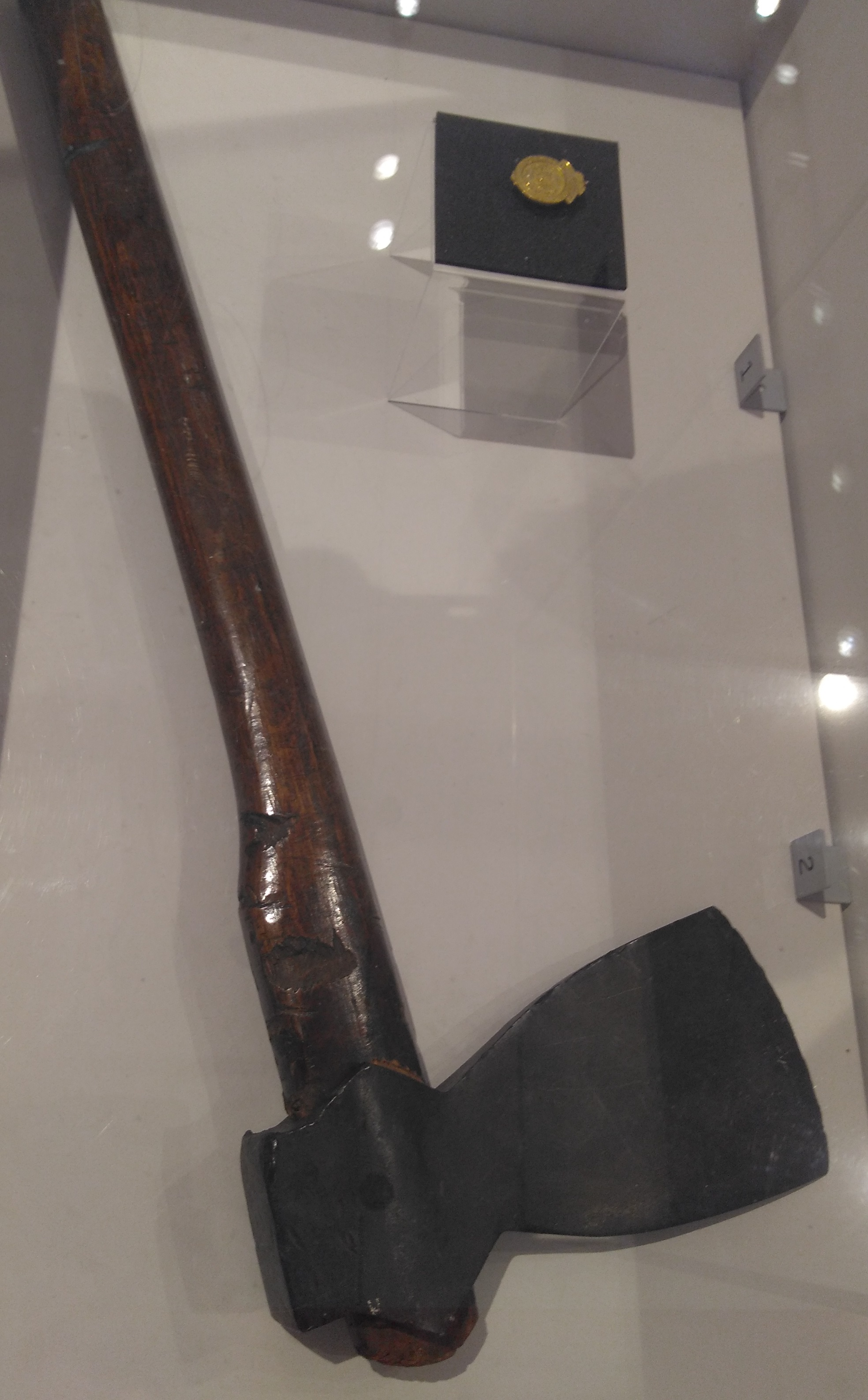
Axe used by SMS Emden landing party to cut submarine telegraph cables on Direction Island, Cocos Islands, in 1914. Displayed at Porthcurno Telegraph Museum.

After taking control of the station and its 34 staff, German personnel smashed the transmitting equipment and severed two of the station's three undersea cables, as well as a dummy cable. They also felled the main wireless mast; although they took care at the request of the staff to avoid damaging the station's tennis court, the mast landed on a cache of Scotch whisky. At around 09:00, lookouts on Emden saw smoke from an approaching ship. Initially assumed to be Buresk, by 09:15 she had been identified as an approaching warship, believed to be HMS Newcastle or another vessel of similar vintage. As Emden was prepared for battle, several signals were sent to the shore party to hurry up, but at 09:30, the raider had to raise anchor and sail to meet the approaching hostile ship, leaving von Mücke's party behind despite their best efforts to catch up.

The ANZAC convoy, positioned 80 kilometres (50 mi) north-east of the Cocos Islands, heard the coded Buresk summons, then the distress call from Direction Island. Believing the unidentified ship to be Emden or Königsberg (also believed to be at large in the region), Melbourne's captain, Mortimer Silver, ordered his ship to make full speed and turn for Cocos. Silver quickly realised that as commander of the convoy escort, he needed to remain with the troopships, and he reluctantly ordered Sydney to detach. Ibuki raised her battle ensign and requested permission to follow Sydney, but the Japanese ship was ordered to remain with the convoy. At 09:15, Sydney spotted Direction Island and the attacking ship. Confident of being able to outrun, outrange, and outshoot the German vessel, Glossop ordered the ship to prepare for action. He agreed with his gunnery officer to open fire at 9,500 yards (8,700 m): well within Sydney's firing range, but outside the believed range of Emden's guns.

=== Combat ===
Emden was the first to fire at 09:40, and scored hits on her fourth salvo: two shells exploded near the aft control station and wrecked the aft rangefinders, while a third punched through the forward rangefinder and through the bridge without exploding. These shots landed at a range of approximately 10,000 yards (9,100 m); the 30-degree elevation of her main guns allowed her to fire much further than British estimates. Von Müller recognised that his success in the battle required Emden to do as much damage as possible before the other ship retaliated, but despite the heavy rate of fire from the Germans over the next ten minutes (at points reaching a salvo every six seconds), the high angle of the guns and the narrow profile presented by Sydney meant that only fifteen shells hit the Australian warship, of which only five exploded. As well as the rangefinders, damage was sustained to the S2 gun when a nearby impact sent hot shrapnel into the gun crew then ignited cordite charges being stored nearby for the fight, and another shell exploded in a forward mess deck. Four sailors were killed and another sixteen wounded; the only casualties aboard Sydney during the entire engagement.

Sydney attempted to open the gap between the two ships as she opened fire. This was hampered by the loss of both rangefinders, requiring each mounting to be targeted and fired locally. The first two salvoes missed, but two shells from the third struck: one exploding in Emden's wireless office, another by the Germans' forward gun. Heavy fire from Sydney damaged or destroyed Emden's steering gear, rangefinders, and the voicepipes to the turrets and engineering, and knocked out several guns. The forward funnel collapsed overboard, then the foremast fell and crushed the fore-bridge. A shell from Sydney landed in the aft ammunition room of Emden, and the Germans had to flood it or risk a massive explosion.

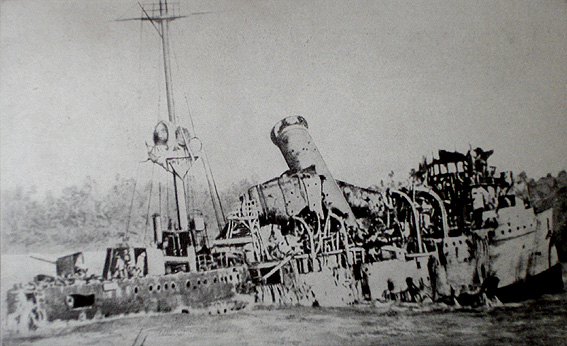
Emden beached on North Keeling Island

At around 10:20, the manoeuvring of the two ships brought them to within 5,500 yards (5,000 m), and Glossop took the opportunity to order a torpedo firing. The torpedo failed to cover the distance, and sank without exploding. The Australian ship sped up and turned to starboard so guns that had yet to fire could engage. Emden matched Sydney's turn, but by this point, the second funnel had been blasted off, and there was a fire in the engine room. In addition, about half of the cruiser's personnel had been killed or wounded, and the abandoning of the attack party on Direction Island meant there were no reserves to replace them. By 11:00, only one of Emden's guns was still firing. As the third funnel went overboard, Emden found herself closer to North Keeling Island, and von Müller ordered the ship to beach there, hoping to prevent further loss of life. Emden ran aground at around 11:20, at which point, Sydney ceased fire. After Sydney contacted the convoy to report "Emden beached and done for", the soldiers aboard the troopships were granted a half-day holiday from duties and training to celebrate.

=== After Emden's beaching ===
Sydney then turned to pursue and capture Buresk, which had arrived on the horizon during the battle. The cruiser caught up shortly after 12:00 and fired a warning shot, but on closing with Buresk, Sydney found the collier had already commenced scuttling. Sydney recovered the boarding party and the crew from Buresk, fired four shells to hasten the collier's sinking, then once she had submerged, turned back towards North Keeling Island.

The Australian cruiser reached Emden around 16:00. The Germans' battle ensign was still flying, generally a sign that a ship intends to continue fighting. Sydney signalled "Do you surrender?" in international code by both lights and flag-hoist. The signal was not understood, and Emden responded with "What signal? No signal books". The instruction to surrender was repeated by Sydney in plain morse code, then after there was no reply, the message "Have you received my signal?" was sent. With no response forthcoming, and operating under the assumption that Emden could still potentially fire, launch torpedoes, or use small arms against any boarding parties, Glossop ordered Sydney to fire two salvoes into the wrecked ship. This attack killed 20 German personnel. The ensign was pulled down and burned, and a white sheet was raised over the quarterdeck as a flag of surrender. During the battle, 130 personnel aboard Emden were killed, and 69 were wounded; four of the latter died of their wounds.

Glossop had orders to ascertain the status of the transmission station, and left with Sydney to do so, after sending a boat with Buresk's crew to Emden with some medical supplies and a message that they would return the next day. In addition to checking on Direction Island, there was also the potential that Emden and Königsberg had been operating together and that the second ship would approach to recover the attack party from the island, or go after the troop convoy; consequently, Sydney could not render assistance to Emden's survivors until such threats had passed. It was too late to make a landing on Direction Island, so the cruiser spent the night patrolling the islands, and approached the wireless station the next morning. On arrival, the Australians learned that the Germans had escaped the previous evening in a commandeered schooner. Sydney embarked the island's doctor and two assistants, then headed for North Keeling Island.

== Aftermath ==
The Australian cruiser reached the wreck of Emden at 13:00 on 10 November. After sending an officer over to receive assurance that the Germans would not fight, Glossop began a rescue operation. Transferring the German survivors from Emden to Sydney took about five hours, with the difficulty of transferring so many wounded, rough seas, and overcrowding aboard the Australian cruiser. The two Australian medical officers aboard Sydney and the medical staff from Direction Island worked from 18:00 on 10 November to 04:30 the next morning to clear the most pressing needs for medical attention, with Emden survivors prioritised. Some of the Germans had swum ashore after the beaching, and the difficulty of recovering them from the beach in the dark meant the rescue of the 20-odd survivors was put off until the morning of 11 November, although personnel from Sydney and Buresk were sent ashore the previous evening with supplies. Most of 11 November was spent treating less pressing cases; the Direction Island staff left the ship around midday, and Emden's ship's surgeon, who had previously been unable to assist because of the shock and stress of caring for so many wounded from the battle's end until Sydney returned, had recovered enough by this point to assist as an anaesthetist.

On 12 November, the auxiliary cruiser Empress of Russia arrived, and the majority of the German personnel (excluding the officers and those too injured to be moved) were transferred over for transportation to Colombo. Sydney caught up to the ANZAC convoy at Colombo on 15 November. There were no celebrations of Sydney's success as the cruiser entered harbour: Glossop had signalled ahead to request that the sailors and soldiers aboard the warships and transports refrain from cheering, out of respect for the German wounded being carried aboard.

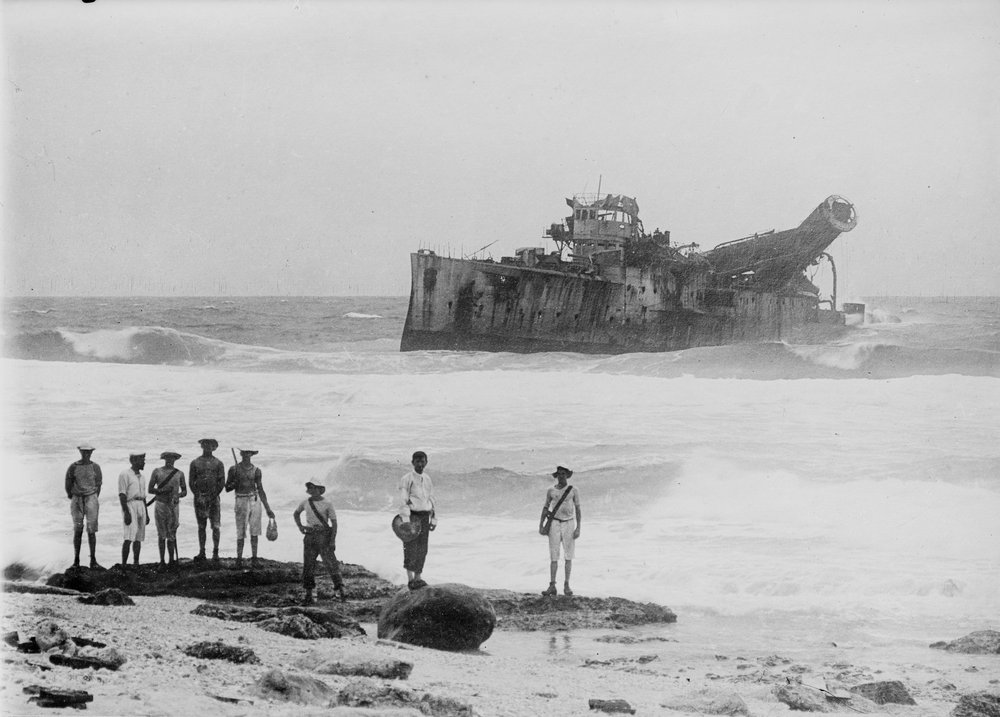
The wreck of Emden, some years after the battle

After Emden's defeat, the only German warship in the Indian Ocean basin was SMS Königsberg; the cruiser had been blockaded in the Rufiji River in October, and remained there until her destruction in July 1915. Australia was no longer under direct threat from the Central Powers, and many of the RAN ships designated for the nation's defence could be safely deployed to other theatres. Over the next two years, troop convoys from Australia and New Zealand to the Middle East sailed without naval escort, further freeing Allied resources. The state of affairs persisted until the raiders Wolf and Seeadler began operations in the region in 1917.

=== Emden ===
Von Müller and a small complement of officers were sent to Malta and imprisoned at the Verdala Barracks. The rest of the personnel were taken to Australia and placed in prisoner-of-war camps at Holsworthy, Trial Bay, and Berrima. Five sailors, suffering from long-term effects of wounds and amputations were repatriated to Germany in 1916.

Von Müller was awarded the Iron Cross, First Class for the battle. The Kaiser announced the construction of a new Emden on 15 November, which would bear an Iron Cross on her bow. A Königsberg-class cruiser laid down in 1914 was named SMS Emden on completion in 1916, and built with an Iron Cross mounted on her stem-head.

Shortly after the battle, the auxiliary cruiser Empress of Japan visited the wreck to recover the signal logs from Emden. In 1915, a Japanese company proposed that the ship be repaired and refloated, but an inspection by HMAS Protector concluded that surf damage to Emden made such an operation unfeasible. By 1919, there were reports that the wreck had disappeared. The wreck was eventually broken up in situ in the early 1950s by a Japanese salvage company; parts of the ship remain scattered around the area.

=== Sydney ===
After completing escort duties, the Australian ship was deployed to the North America and West Indies Station for eighteen months, then spent the rest of the war attached to the British Grand Fleet. At the surrender of the German High Seas Fleet, in November 1918, Sydney was assigned to escort the new Emden.

Sydney remained in service until 1928, and was broken up for scrap in 1929. For the battle, Sydney was awarded the battle honour "Emden 1914". This was the first honour for a single ship action awarded to a RAN vessel, and one of only three awarded to any British Commonwealth ship during the 20th century. Glossop was appointed a Companion of the Order of the Bath.

=== Landing party ===
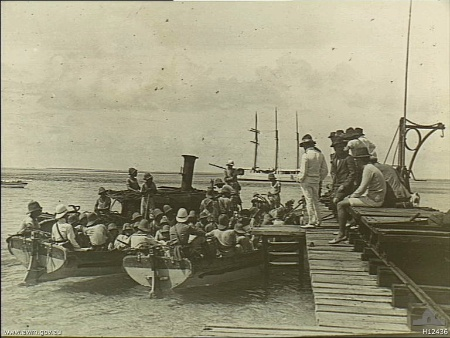
The German sailors at the Direction Island Jetty, about to head to Ayesha (background)

After being abandoned, the German shore party returned to Direction Island, placed the territory under German martial law, and set up weapons on the beach to oppose a potential landing. They witnessed the first stages of the battle, but by the time the combatants disappeared from view, it was clear that Emden had been seriously damaged, and if she survived, von Müller's priority would be heading to a neutral port to effect repairs. Unlikely to hold the beach against any investigating Allied warships, von Mücke decided to commandeer the 97-ton schooner Ayesha, which had been anchored in the lagoon, and attempt to sail to the neutral Dutch East Indies. With the willing assistance of the station staff, the Germans loaded Ayesha with half the island's food supply, then towed the schooner out of the lagoon with the steam launch that evening.

The schooner initially sailed to Padang, where they were escorted into port on 27 November by the Dutch destroyer Lynx and only allowed to remain under strict terms, so the Netherlands could maintain their stance of neutrality. With the threat that Ayesha would be seized by Dutch authorities, von Mücke took the schooner out during the night of 28 November, and headed for a rendezvous point he had announced to the German merchant vessels sheltering at Padang. On 14 December, the freighter Choising arrived at the rendezvous, and the Germans were welcomed aboard. Choising delivered them to Hodeida on 9 January 1915. After a lack of help and extensive delays, von Mücke marched his force to Sanaa, arriving on 6 February 1915. After another round of delays disguised as hospitality, the Germans returned to Hodeida, hired two 14-metre (46 ft) sambuks and sailed north along the coast on 14 March. Three days later, one sambuk grounded on a coral reef, then sank with no lost crew. On reaching Al Qunfudhah, von Mücke hired a larger vessel, then sailed to Al Lith, where one of the Germans died from typhus. The Germans headed overland to Jeddah with a party of Turkish and Arab guards, and were forced to fight running battles against Bedouin raiders from 30 March. Another two Germans were killed, and a third wounded before a relief force arrived to escort them to Jeddah. Another chartered sambuk took the party to Al Wajh, arriving on 29 April. They were escorted to the Hejaz Railway, then travelled to Constantinople, reporting to the German admiral stationed there on 23 May.

== In popular culture ==
How We Fought the Emden (1915) and The Exploits of the Emden (1928) were two Australian silent films depicting the battle and the events leading up to it.

In 2010, German director Berengar Pfahl began work on Die Männer der Emden (The Emden Men), a film based on the story of the 50 German sailors left behind on Direction Island and their voyage home. Much of the filming occurred in Sri Lanka, with the luxury yacht Raja Laut used to represent the schooner Ayesha. The film was released in 2012.
