= Zeppelin LZ 92 =

LZ 92 (tactical number L 43)
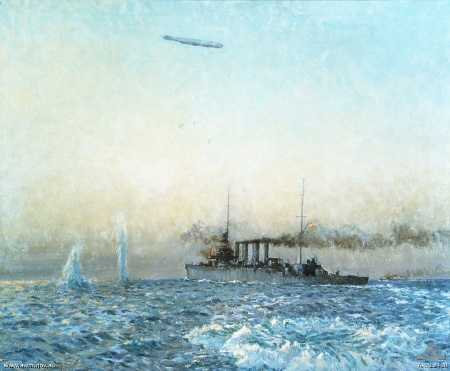
- Zeppelin LZ 92 (tactical L 43) during the Action of 4 May 1917

General information
- Other name: L 43
- Type: S-Class rigid reconnaissance airship (Zeppelin)
- National origin: Imperial Germany
- Manufacturer: Zeppelin Luftschiffbau
- Designer: Ludwig Dürr
- Status: Destroyed
- Primary user: Kaiserliche Marine
- Service: 1917
- Major applications: Maritime reconnaissance; bombing raids
- Number built: 1 (LZ 92 corresponds to tactical L 43)
- Construction number: LZ 92
- Serial: L 43
- Flights: 7 (6 reconnaissance, 1 raid)

History
- Introduction date: March 1917
- First flight: 6 March 1917
- In service: 1917
- Last flight: 14 June 1917
- Outcome: Destroyed in action (shot down 14 June 1917)
- Developed from: S-class Zeppelin design lineage
- Preserved at: Wreckage lost; fragments in museum collections
- Fate: Shot down and crashed into the North Sea 14 June 1917

The LZ 92 (tactical number L 43) was a German S-class (naval) Zeppelin used by the Kaiserliche Marine in 1917 for maritime reconnaissance and limited bombing operations; she flew during the spring and early summer of 1917 and was shot down on 14 June 1917 with the loss of her 25 crewmember onboard.

== Construction and characteristics ==
LZ 92 was built to the S-class (naval) Zeppelin design and completed in early 1917; contemporary reference works and museum descriptions record her as an S-type Zeppelin used for reconnaissance at high altitude.

Contemporary accounts list LZ 92/L 43 as having the typical S-class arrangement of multiple Maybach engines, gas cells and long endurance suitable for North Sea patrols and high-altitude reconnaissance.

== War career ==
LZ 92 entered service in March 1917 and conducted several reconnaissance sorties over the North Sea and one recorded attack on English-area targets during her short career.

On 4 May 1917 LZ 92 (L 43) engaged Allied ships in the North Sea and dropped a number of bombs near the British squadron that included the Australian cruiser HMAS Sydney; fragments and a contemporary report of the engagement are preserved in museum collections.

Accounts of HMS/HMAS encounters show L 43 shadowing surface forces on at least one occasion in early May 1917, firing on destroyers and attempting bombing runs from high altitude.

== Destruction (14 June 1917) ==
On 14 June 1917 LZ 92 (L 43) was intercepted by a Felixstowe H12 flying boat (Felixstowe, Flight Sub-Lieutenant Basil D. Hobbs pilot) while on patrol; the seaplane attacked from a higher altitude and used incendiary and tracer rounds, which set the airship ablaze; L 43 broke in two and crashed into the sea near Vlieland, the Netherlands with the loss of all the 25 crew members.

Photographic evidence held in museum collections shows the wreckage and contemporary photographs of L 43’s destruction and rescue / recovery operations, and the Australian War Memorial holds related photographic items documenting the action and its aftermath.

The loss of L 43 and similar incidents prompted a tactical shift in German naval airship operations away from lower-level patrols and toward higher altitude operations, as British seaplanes and flying boats developed effective attack techniques.

== Aftermath and surviving relics ==
Fragments of bombs and other material associated with LZ 92 have been preserved in museum collections; one such item is a splinter of a bomb reportedly recovered from HMAS Sydney after the 4 May engagement, now catalogued in the Australian War Memorial collection.

The destruction of L 43 (LZ 92) is also recorded in later museum and reference summaries (photo records and illustrated histories) making L 43 one of the better-documented Zeppelin losses of 1917.

== Specifications (LZ 92 / tactical L 43) ==
Data from Zeppelin : rigid airships, 1893-1940

General characteristics

- Crew: 18–20
- Capacity: 1,850 kg (4,079 lb) recorded bomb load (variable)
- Length: 198 m (649 ft 7 in)
- Diameter: 23.9 m (78 ft 5 in) maximum
- Fineness ratio: 8.28
- Volume: 55,500 m^{3} (1,960,000 cu ft) in 16 gas cells (S-class)
- Empty weight: 25,000 kg (55,116 lb) approximate (S-class)
- Gross weight: 28,900 kg (63,714 lb) approximate (S-class)
- Fuel capacity: 5,600 kg (12,346 lb)
- Useful lift: 61,000 kg (134,000 lb) hydrogen, standard conditions (S-class)
- Powerplant: 5 × Maybach HSLu 6-cylinder water-cooled inline piston engines, 180 kW (240 hp) each
- Propellers: 4-bladed Lorenzen fixed-pitch propellers

Performance

- Maximum speed: 103 km/h (64 mph, 56 kn) typical S-class maximum
- Cruise speed: 80 km/h (50 mph, 43 kn)
- Range: 7,400 km (4,600 mi, 4,000 nmi) at 80 km/h (50 mph; 43 kn) typical cruise
- Service ceiling: 5,500 m (18,000 ft) operational patrol altitude (reported for L 43)
- Rate of climb: 10 m/s (2,000 ft/min) max permitted (S-class)

Armament

- Guns: machine-guns in hull-top positions and gondolas
- Bombs: up to 1,850 kg (4,079 lb) recorded bomb load
