= SS Buresk (sunk 1914) =

British steamship

History

United Kingdom
- Name: Buresk
- Owner: Burdick and Cook
- Port of registry: London
- Builder: Richardson, Duck and Company, Thornaby-on-Tees
- Yard number: 638
- Launched: 25 March 1914
- Completed: May 1914
- Identification: Official number: 136721
- Fate: Sunk 9 November 1914

General characteristics
- Tonnage: 4,337 GRT
- Length: 308 ft 1 in (93.90 m)
- Beam: 51 ft (16 m)

SS Buresk was a 4,337-ton steamship built by Richardson, Duck and Company in Thornaby-on-Tees, Yorkshire, England for Burdick and Cook Ltd, London in 1914. The vessel was launched in March 1914 and completed in May 1914 before entering service. It was captured by the Imperial German Navy during World War I and used as a supply vessel for the light cruiser SMS Emden.

After Emden was sunk by the Royal Australian Navy in the Battle of Cocos, the crew of Buresk began scuttling the vessel before the process was hastened by the light cruiser HMAS Sydney.

== Design and construction ==
Buresk was a steel screw steamer designed and built by Richardson, Duck and Company in Thornaby-on-Tees, Yorkshire, England for Burdick and Cook Ltd, London. She had a standard displacement of 4,337 tons. The steamship was 380 feet 1 inch (115.8 m) long overall and had a triple-expansion three-cylinder steam engine and one propeller.

== History ==
Buresk was launched on 25 March 1914 and competed in May 1914. While on her way to Hong Kong with a cargo of coal, she was captured by SMS Emden of the Imperial German Navy on 27 September 1914. Emden's crew retained her as a prize and used her as a collier. Buresk was one of 27 vessels which had been captured or sunk by Emden under Captain Karl von Müller while patroling the Indian Ocean during World War I.

On 9 November 1914, Emden became engaged in battle with the HMAS Sydney, a light cruiser of the Royal Australian Navy, off the coast of the Cocos (Keeling) Islands. Known as the Battle of Cocos, Emden suffered several casualties and severe damage which forced Müller to beach the cruiser off North Keeling Island in the hopes of preventing further loss of life.

Sydney then turned her attention to trying to capture Buresk. However, the crew had already began scuttling the collier. After recovering the boarding party and the crew from Buresk, Sydney fired four shells to hasten the vessel's sinking.
