= HMS Pelican (1916) =

British M-Class destroyer, WW1

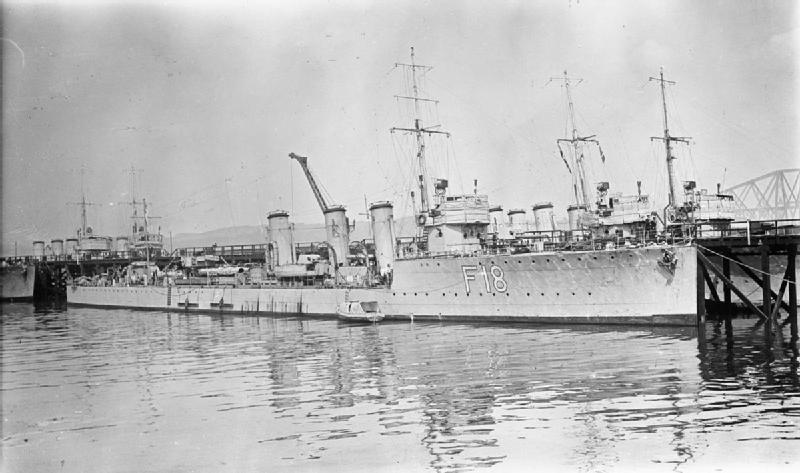
- Sister ship HMS Paladin

History

United Kingdom
- Name: HMS Pelican
- Namesake: Pelican
- Ordered: May 1915
- Builder: William Beardmore and Company, Dalmuir
- Yard number: 537
- Laid down: 25 June 1915
- Launched: 18 March 1916
- Completed: 1 April 1916
- Out of service: 9 May 1921
- Fate: Sold to be broken up

General characteristics
- Class & type: Admiralty M-class destroyer
- Displacement: 994 long tons (1,010 t) normal; 1,250 long tons (1,270 t) full load
- Length: 273 ft 6 in (83.4 m)
- Beam: 26 ft 9 in (8.2 m)
- Draught: 8 ft 5 in (2.57 m)
- Propulsion: 3 Yarrow boilers; 2 Brown-Curtis steam turbines, 25,000 shp (19,000 kW)
- Speed: 34 knots (63.0 km/h; 39.1 mph)
- Range: 3,450 nmi (6,390 km; 3,970 mi) at 15 kn (28 km/h; 17 mph)
- Complement: 76
- Armament: 3 × QF 4 in (102 mm) Mark IV guns (3×1); 1 × 2-pounder (40 mm) "pom-pom" Mk. II anti-aircraft gun (1×1); 4 × 21 in (533 mm) torpedo tubes (2×2)

HMS Pelican was a Admiralty M-class destroyer which served with the Royal Navy during the First World War. The M class were an improvement on the preceding L class, capable of higher speed. Launched on 18 March 1916, the vessel served with the Grand Fleet, taking part in significant actions on 19 August 1916 and 4 May 1917, as well as the fight between the British and German battlecruisers in the Battle of Jutland. The destroyer also undertook the other more general roles were typical of the type, including anti-submarine sweeps and escort duties for convoys. The destroyer had success driving away German submarines but did not sink any. After the end of the war, Pelican initially joined a Local Defence Flotilla but within a year had been placed in reserve and was subsequently sold to be broken up on 9 May 1921.

== Design and development ==
Pelican was one of sixteen Admiralty M-class destroyers ordered by the British Admiralty in May 1915 as part of the Fifth War Construction Programme. The M-class was an improved version of the earlier L-class destroyer destroyers, designed to reach a higher speed in order to counter rumoured German fast destroyers, although it transpired these vessels did not exist.

The destroyer was 273 feet 6 inches (83.36 m) long overall, with a beam of 26 feet 9 inches (8.15 m) and a draught of 8 feet 5 inches (2.57 m). Displacement was 994 long tons (1,010 t) normal and 1,250 long tons (1,270 t) full load. Power was provided by three Yarrow boilers feeding two Brown-Curtis steam turbines rated at 25,000 shaft horsepower (19,000 kW) and driving two shafts, to give a design speed of 34 knots (63 km/h; 39 mph). Three funnels were fitted. 296 long tons (301 t) of oil were carried, giving a design range of 3,450 nautical miles (6,390 km; 3,970 mi) at 15 knots (28 km/h; 17 mph).

Armament consisted of three 4-inch (102 mm) Mk IV QF guns on the ship's centreline, with one on the forecastle, one aft on a raised platform and one between the middle and aft funnels. A single 2-pounder (40 mm) pom-pom anti-aircraft gun was carried, while torpedo armament consisted of two twin mounts for 21 in (533 mm) torpedoes. The ship had a complement of 76 officers and ratings.

== Construction and career ==
Pelican was laid down by William Beardmore and Company of Dalmuir on 25 June 1915 with the yard number 537, launched on 18 March the following year and completed on 1 April. The vessel was the fifteenth to be named after the birds in the genus Pelecanus to enter naval service since 1646. The ship was deployed as part of the Grand Fleet, joining the newly formed Thirteenth Destroyer Flotilla.

Pelican participated in the Battle of Jutland, taking part in the destroyer attack on the battlecruisers of the German High Seas Fleet after the destruction of the Indefatigable and Queen Mary of the 1st Battlecruiser Squadron, although no hits were claimed. Towards the end of the battle, the destroyer joined the attack, led by the destroyer Lydiard, on the German battlecruisers as they retreated. Once again, no hits were recorded. On 19 August, the light cruiser Falmouth was struck by a torpedo. Pelican was one of three destroyers sent to assist the stricken ship. As Pelican approached, the periscope of U-66 was seen and the destroyer attacked, dropping a depth charge which shook the German boat. The destroyer was successful in driving away the submarine.

On 18 January the following year, the destroyer was one of six that undertook what were termed high-speed sweeps, looking for submarines with paravanes. The first attempt, the following day, on Dogger Bank was not a success. 1917 also saw Pelican escort the light cruisers Dublin and Sydney in the Action of 4 May, which involved attacks from German airships as well as submarines. Pelican escaped from this unharmed. The vessel was also involved in escorting merchant ships in the convoys that crossed the Atlantic Ocean.

After the armistice, the Royal Navy returned to a peacetime level of mobilisation. Initially Pelican joined the Local Defence Flotilla at Portsmouth. However, this service did not last long and on 17 October 1919, the destroyer was reduced and placed in the Reserve Fleet. Pelican was sold to Thos. W. Ward on 9 May 1921, arriving at Briton Ferry to be broken up on 5 January 1923.

== Pennant numbers ==
Pennant number	Date
G58	September 1915
F10	January 1917
HA8	January 1918
F19	January 1919
