= HMS Obdurate (1916) =

British M-Class destroyer, WW1

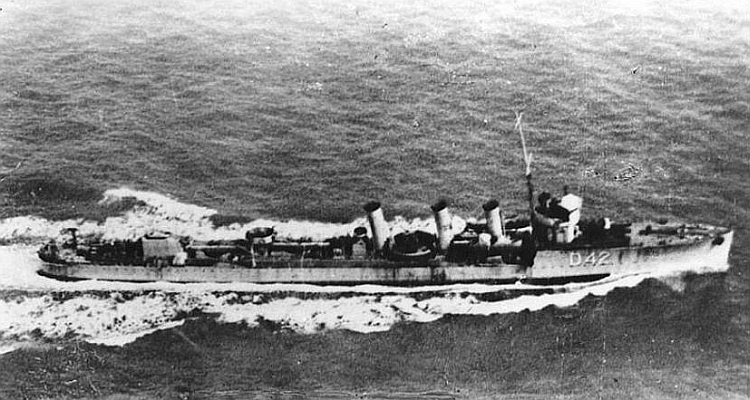
- Sister ship Pasley

History

United Kingdom
- Name: HMS Obdurate
- Ordered: November 1914
- Builder: Scotts of Greenock
- Yard number: 465
- Laid down: May 1915
- Launched: 21 January 1916
- Completed: 23 March 1916
- Out of service: 15 November 1921
- Fate: Sold to be broken up

General characteristics
- Class & type: Admiralty M-class destroyer
- Displacement: 994 long tons (1,010 t) normal; 1,025 long tons (1,041 t) full load
- Length: 265 ft (80.8 m)
- Beam: 26 ft 8 in (8.1 m)
- Draught: 9 ft 3 in (2.82 m)
- Propulsion: 3 Yarrow boilers; 2 Brown-Curtis steam turbines, 25,000 shp (19,000 kW)
- Speed: 34 knots (39.1 mph; 63.0 km/h)
- Range: 3,450 nmi (6,390 km) at 15 kn (28 km/h)
- Complement: 76
- Armament: 3 × QF 4-inch (102 mm) Mark IV guns (3×1); 1 × single 2-pounder (40-mm) "pom-pom" Mk. II anti-aircraft gun (1×1); 4 × 21 in (533 mm) torpedo tubes (2×2)

HMS Obdurate was an Admiralty M-class destroyer which served with the Royal Navy during the First World War. The M class were an improvement on the previous L-class, capable of higher speed. Launched on 21 January 1916 by Scotts of Greenock, the vessel served as part of the Grand Fleet in the Battle of Jutland in May 1916. The destroyer formed part of the cover for the British battlecruisers and was involved in attacks on German battleships and destroyers, but recorded no hits. The destroyer was also part of attack by Zeppelin L 43 on Sydney and the distant cover for the Second Battle of Heligoland Bight, but received only minor damage from the German airship. After the armistice, Obdurate was assigned to the Local Defence Force at Nore and sold to be broken up on 9 May 1921.

== Design and development ==
Obdurate was one of twenty-two Admiralty M-class destroyers ordered by the British Admiralty in November 1914 as part of the Third War Construction Programme. The M-class was an improved version of the earlier L-class destroyers, required to reach a higher speed in order to counter rumoured German fast destroyers. The design was to achieve a speed of 36 knots (67 km/h; 41 mph), although the destroyers did not achieve this in service. It transpired that the German ships did not exist but the greater performance was appreciated by the navy.

The destroyer was 265 feet (80.8 m) long overall, with a beam of 26 ft 8 in (8.1 m) and a draught of 9 ft 3 in (2.8 m). Displacement was 994 long tons (1,010 t) normal and 1,025 long tons (1,041 t) full load. Power was provided by three Yarrow boilers feeding two Brown-Curtis steam turbines rated at 25,000 shaft horsepower (19,000 kW) and driving two shafts, to give a design speed of 34 kn (63 km/h; 39 mph). Three funnels were fitted. A fuel load of 296 long tons (301 t) of oil was carried, giving a design range of 3,450 nautical miles (6,390 km; 3,970 mi) at 15 knots (28 km/h; 17 mph). The ship had a complement of 76 officers and ratings.

Armament consisted of three 4 in (102 mm) Mk IV QF guns on the ship's centreline, with one on the forecastle, one aft on a raised platform and one between the middle and aft funnels. A single 2-pounder (40 mm) pom-pom anti-aircraft gun was carried, while torpedo armament consisted of two rotating twin mounts for 21 in (533 mm) torpedoes.

== Construction and career ==
Obdurate was laid down by Scotts Shipbuilding and Engineering Company of Greenock with the yard number 465 in May 1915, launched on 21 January the following year and completed on 23 March. The ship was the first of the name to serve with the navy. The vessel was deployed as part of the Grand Fleet, joining the Thirteenth Destroyer Flotilla.

On 30 May 1916, the destroyer sailed with the Grand Fleet to confront the German High Seas Fleet in what would be the Battle of Jutland. Obdurate was one of fourteen M-class destroyers that were allocated to form part of the screen to protect the battlecruisers of the Fleet. Led by the light cruiser Champion, Obdurate and sister ship Moresby took part in the attack of the German fleet that led to the destruction of the battleship Pommern. As the warships broke apart, Champion sped away in pursuit of the German fleet, leaving the majority of the destroyers behind, with only Moresby and Obdurate able to keep up.

The small flotilla sought for the main German fleet, and at 2:15 turned westwards towards gunfire. They saw four German cruisers with their attendant destroyers but did not engage as the enemy ships sped away, later narrowly missing attacking four destroyers before they disappeared into the haze. Returning to the British lines, the three ships were spotted by the German torpedo boats G40 and V45, which launched torpedoes, but both sides escaped without recording a hit. In the aftermath of the battle, Obdurate rescued two sailors from the destroyer Ardent, which had been sunk in the action.

On 4 May 1917, Obdurate was escorting the light cruisers Dublin and Sydney when the flotilla came under attack from submarines and airships. The destroyer attacked what was thought to be a submarine periscope and received minor damage when a bomb dropped by Zeppelin L 43 narrowly missed but was otherwise unharmed. On 16 November that year, Obdurate was part of the destroyer screen for the 1st Battlecruiser Squadron, led by Lion, that provided distant cover at the Second Battle of Heligoland Bight but did not engage with the enemy. The vessel was also involved in escorting merchant ships in the convoys that crossed the Atlantic Ocean.

After the armistice, the Royal Navy returned to a peacetime level of service, and surplus vessels were culled. Obdurate was initially allocated to the Local Defence Force at Nore. On 15 November 1921, the vessel was sold to Cashmore of Newport, Wales, and was broken up from the following May. It was announced that the ship's bell was to be sold on 31 March 1928.

== Pennant numbers ==
Pennant number	Date
F06	January 1917
F07	January 1918
H50	June 1918
G26	September 1915
F83	January 1919
HA2	January 1922
