= HMAS Sydney (1912) =

Town-class light cruiser

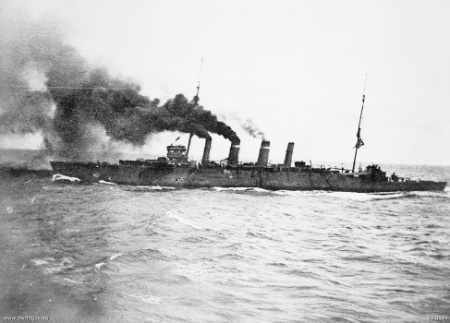
- Sydney steaming for Rabaul, September 1914

History

Australia
- Name: Sydney
- Namesake: City of Sydney
- Builder: London and Glasgow Engineering and Iron Shipbuilding Company
- Laid down: 11 February 1911
- Launched: 29 August 1912
- Commissioned: 26 June 1913
- Decommissioned: 8 May 1928
- Motto: "Thorough and Ready"
- Honours and awards: Battle honours: Rabaul 1914; Emden 1914; North Sea 1916–18
- Fate: Broken up for scrap in 1929

General characteristics
- Class & type: Town-class light cruiser; Chatham subclass
- Displacement: 5,400 long tons (5,500 t)
- Length: 456 ft 10 3/8 in (139.25 m)
- Beam: 49 ft 10 in (15.19 m)
- Draught: 19 ft 7 in (5.97 m)
- Propulsion: Parsons turbines, Yarrow boilers, 4 propellers
- Speed: 25.7 knots (47.6 km/h; 29.6 mph)
- Complement: 376 standard, 475 maximum
- Armament: 8 × BL 6-inch (152 mm) Mk XI guns; 1 × 3-inch (76 mm) anti-aircraft gun; 1 × 12-pounder (76 mm) 8-cwt field gun; 10 × 0.303-inch machine guns; 2 × 21-inch (530 mm) torpedo tubes; 2 × depth charge chutes; 4 × 3-pounder gun (47 mm) saluting guns
- Armour: Belt: 1.5–3 in (38–76 mm); Deck: 0.4–1.5 in (10–38 mm); Gun Shields: 4 in (102 mm); Conning Tower: 4 in (102 mm)
- Aircraft carried: 1 Sopwith Pup

HMAS Sydney was a Chatham-class light cruiser of the Royal Australian Navy (RAN). Laid down in 1911 and launched in 1912, the cruiser was commissioned into the RAN in 1913.

During the early stages of World War I, Sydney was involved in supporting the Australian Naval and Military Expeditionary Force, and escorting the first ANZAC convoy. On 9 November 1914, she defeated the German cruiser SMS Emden at the Battle of Cocos. During 1915 and 1916, Sydney operated on the North America and West Indies Station, before joining the 2nd Light Cruiser Squadron at Greenock, Scotland in November 1916. On 4 May 1917, the cruiser was involved in an inconclusive action against the German zeppelin L43; neither was damaged. During late 1917, Sydney became the first Australian warship to launch an aircraft, and the first warship to do so from a rotatable platform.

After the war's end, Sydney spent a year in reserve before being reactivated to serve as Flagship of the RAN. The cruiser was decommissioned in 1928 and broken up for scrap. Several sections of the ship, including her bow and foremast, have been preserved as monuments, and three of the ship's main guns saw later use in shore fortifications.

== Design and construction ==
Sydney was a Town-class light cruiser, of the Chatham subclass. She had a standard displacement of 5,400 tons. The cruiser was 456 feet 9.75 inches (139.2 m) long overall and 430 feet (130 m) long between perpendiculars, with a mean of 49 feet 10 inches (15.19 m), and a draught of 19 feet 8 inches (5.99 m). Coal- and oil-fuelled Yarrow boilers were connected to Parsons geared turbines, which provided 25,000 horsepower (19,000 kW) shaft horsepower to the ship's four propellers. Although designed with a maximum speed of 25 knots (46 km/h; 29 mph), Sydney achieved a mean maximum of 25.7 knots (47.6 km/h; 29.6 mph) during trials. Her economical cruising speed was rated at 11 knots (20 km/h; 13 mph) in 1921, and 11.5 knots (21.3 km/h; 13.2 mph) in 1926. The standard ship's company was 376 strong, but during wartime, this would increase to the maximum of 475; 31 officers and 454 sailors.

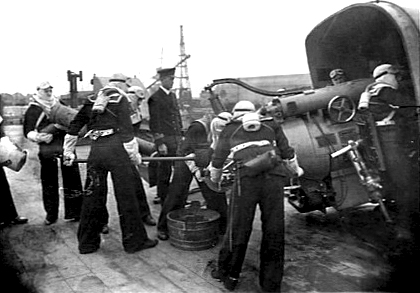
Loading of a 6-inch gun at Portsmouth in January 1919

The cruiser's main armament was made up of eight single BL 6-inch Mark XI guns. Secondary and anti-aircraft armament consisted of a single 3 inches (76 mm) quick-firing high-angle anti-aircraft gun and ten 0.303-inch machine guns (eight Lewis guns and two Maxim guns). Two 21-inch torpedo tubes were fitted, with a payload of seven torpedoes carried. Two hydraulic-release depth charge chutes were carried for anti-submarine warfare. A single 12-pounder 8-cwt field gun and four 3-pounder Hotchkiss saluting guns rounded out the armament. Armour plating consisted of side belts 3-inch (76 mm) thick amidships, tapering to 1.5-inch (38 mm) thick at the bow and stern, along with protective decking over the engineering and magazine spaces, and an armoured conning tower.

Sydney was laid down by the London and Glasgow Engineering and Iron Shipbuilding Company at Glasgow, Scotland, on 11 February 1911. The ship was launched on 29 August 1912 by the wife of Admiral Sir Reginald Henderson. Sydney was completed on 26 June 1913, and commissioned into the RAN that day. The ship cost approximately 385,000 pounds to build.

== Operational history ==
=== Early career and initial war operations ===
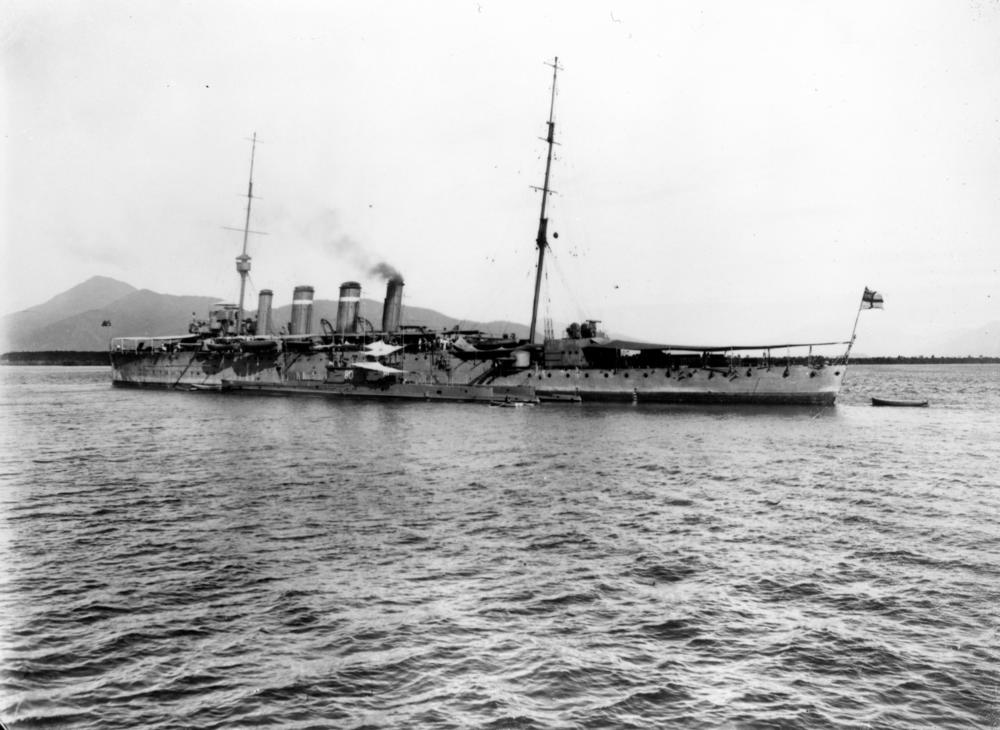
Sydney with AE1 and AE2 in 1914

Sydney arrived in Albany, Western Australia on 19 September 1913, after completing her maiden voyage. The cruiser operated off eastern Australia until March 1914, when she sailed to Singapore to meet the two new Australian submarines AE1 and AE2. The three vessels reached Sydney in May, and the cruiser was reassigned to patrols along the eastern coast.

When World War I started, Sydney was north-bound to join Admiral George Patey and the battlecruiser HMAS Australia. The ships were quickly assigned to protect the Australian Naval and Military Expeditionary Force, which was used to capture German colonial assets in the region; Sydney participated in operations against Rabaul and Anguar Island in September. In October, Sydney and sister ship HMAS Melbourne left Patey's squadron for Sydney, where they joined the escort of the first convoy delivering Australian and New Zealand soldiers to Egypt. The convoy sailed around the southern coast of Australia to Albany, then departed on 1 November for Colombo.

=== Battle of Cocos ===
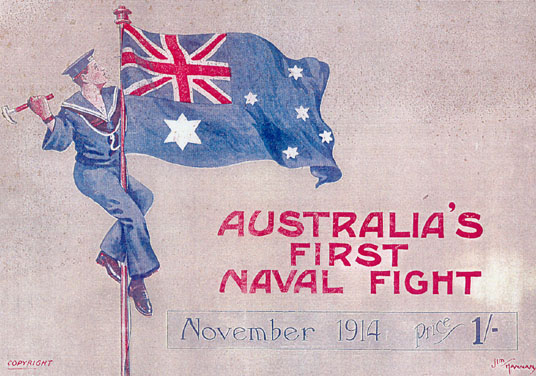
Postcard commemorating the victory of Sydney over Emden at the Battle of Cocos.

On the morning of 9 November, the communications station at Direction Island, in the Cocos (Keeling) Islands group, was captured by the German light cruiser SMS Emden. Before capture, the station was able to transmit an SOS, which was received by the troop convoy, and Sydney was ordered to investigate. Emden's wireless operators had overheard the distress call and the orders to Sydney, and prepared to meet the Australian warship.

Sydney's first indication of Emden's location was when the German ship began to fire at a range of 6 nautical miles (11 km; 6.9 mi). The Australian warship was able to fire for effect after two salvos, destroying Emden's three funnels, foremast, wireless and steering gear, and setting the engine room on fire. The German ship beached herself on North Keeling Island, and Sydney went after the supporting collier Buresk, but the ship had already commenced scuttling, and the Australian warship returned to Emden. The Germans were still flying their war ensign, but pulled it down after Sydney transmitted an instruction to surrender, then fired two salvos when no response was forthcoming.

In the course of the engagement, Sydney had fired some 670 rounds of ammunition, with around 100 hits claimed. She had meanwhile been hit sixteen times; three of her crew were killed and thirteen were wounded. 134 German personnel were killed, with the rest of the ship's company captured by Sydney (apart from a shore party, which commandeered the schooner Ayesha and escaped) and were delivered to British forces at Valletta, Malta. After leaving Malta, the Australian cruiser proceeded to join the North America and West Indies Station, arriving in Bermuda on 6 January 1915.

=== Atlantic Ocean ===
Sydney spent eighteen months uneventfully patrolling along the west coast of the Americas. On 9 September 1916, the cruiser sailed for the United Kingdom, and after a brief refit in Greenock, joined the 5th Battle Squadron at Scapa Flow. On 15 November, Sydney was reassigned to the 2nd Light Cruiser Squadron at Greenock.

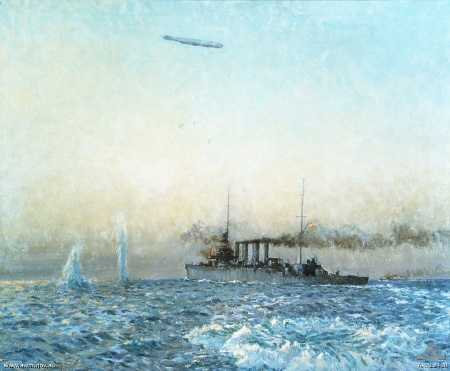
Painting depicting Sydney and L43 in combat

On 4 May 1917, while patrolling in the North Sea with the cruiser Dublin and the destroyers Nepean, Obdurate, Pelican and Pylades, Sydney took part in a battle with Zeppelin L43. The airship dropped 10 to 12 bombs towards Sydney which failed to hit the ship (although the airship claimed to have hit one of the cruisers; the first air attack on an Australian warship. The Zeppelin was driven off by anti-aircraft fire.

In August 1917, Sydney docked at Chatham for a three-month refit. During this, was fitted with a new tripod mast and a revolving aircraft launch platform; the first fitted to any warship. On 8 December, after acquiring a Sopwith Pup aircraft from sister ship Dublin, Sydney became the first RAN vessel to launch an aircraft. On 17 December, the Pup was launched again, this time with the ramp rotated to face into the wind; the first launch of an aircraft from a ship-mounted rotating platform. The Pup was replaced by a Sopwith Camel in early 1918. On 1 June 1918, the aircraft was launched for its only combat sortie, after two German aircraft were spotted while Sydney and the rest of the 2nd Light Cruiser Squadron were heading to Heligoland Bight for a raid. The Camel chased the two aircraft for 60 miles (97 km) and shot down one, but was then forced to break off when one gun jammed and the other ran out of ammunition. Unable to locate Sydney, the pilot ditched near the destroyer HMS Sharpshooter.

The Australian cruiser was present at the surrender of the German High Seas Fleet on 21 November 1918, and was assigned to escort another Emden, the Königsberg-class cruiser named to honour Sydney's opponent at the Battle of Cocos. Sydney left England for home in April 1919. Initially, the cruiser only received one battle honour, "Emden 1914", for her wartime service; this was one of only three single-ship action honours awarded during the 20th century. Following an overhaul of the RAN honours system in 2010, Sydney was retroactively awarded two more battle honours: "Rabaul 1914" and "North Sea 1917–18".

=== Post-war ===
Sydney was paid off into reserve on 13 April 1923. Following a refit, she was recommissioned on 29 September 1924 to serve as Flagship of the RAN.

== Decommissioning and fate ==
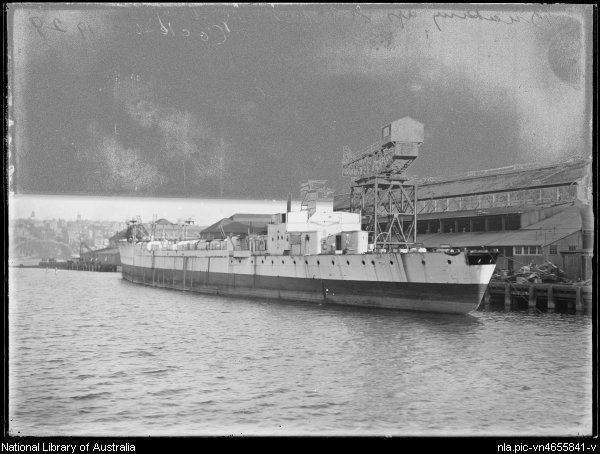
Sydney being scrapped, 1929

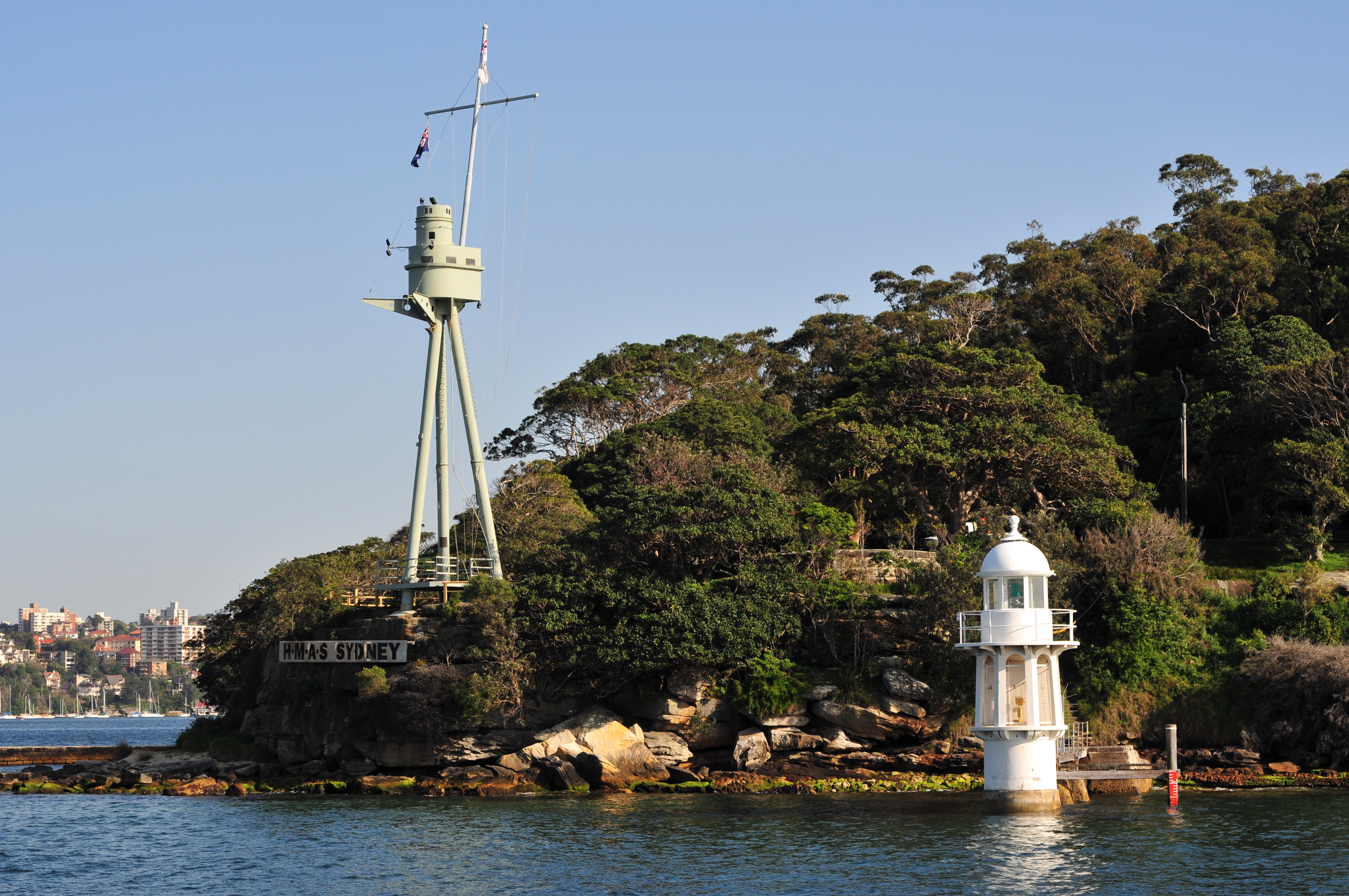
Sydney's tripod foremast at Bradleys Head

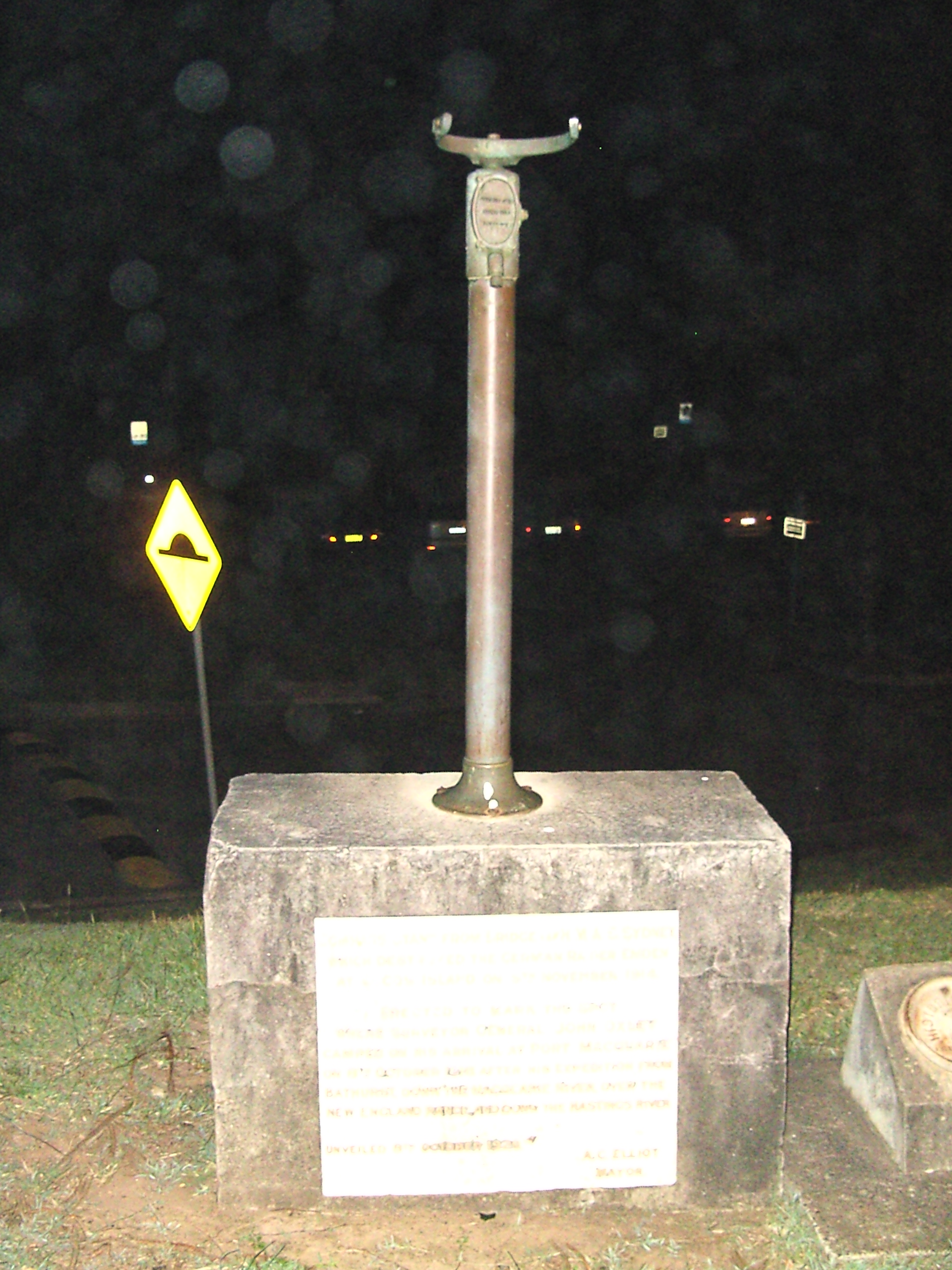
Compass stand from the bridge of HMAS Sydney installed at Port Macquarie

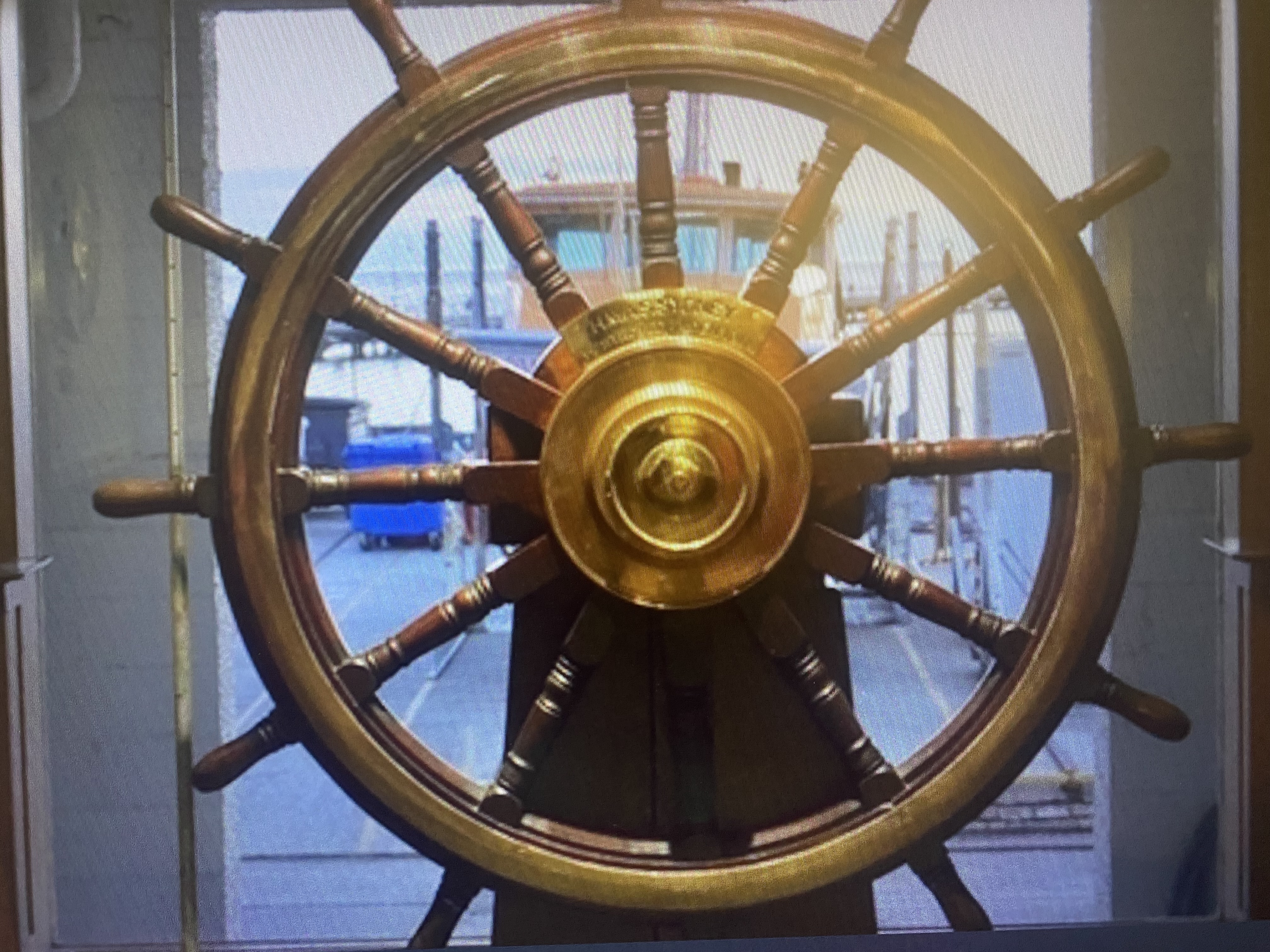
Wheel from HMAS Sydney – donated to RMYS St Kilda by Commodore Joe White in 1930

Sydney paid off at Sydney on 8 May 1928 and arrived at the Cockatoo Island Dockyard in 1929, where she was broken up. The ship's foremast was retained, and in 1934, it was erected at Bradleys Head by the Titan. This initially served as a monument to the engagement against Emden, but was rededicated in 1964 as a monument for all Australian ships lost and all sailors killed in the line of duty. Part of the bow, including the stem head, jackstaff, and fairleads, was set into the seawall at Milsons Point, under the Sydney Harbour Bridge. One of the cruiser's derricks is on display in the Victory Memorial Gardens in Wagga Wagga, and a compass stand is located at Port Macquarie. The main top-mast was erected at Environa, but rotted at the base and collapsed. It was later moved to Jervis Bay.

The wheel from HMAS Sydney is on display in the upstairs foyer at Royal Melbourne Yacht Squadron in St Kilda, Melbourne.

During the 1930s, two of the 6-inch guns were transported to Western Australia, and in 1938 were installed at Buckley Point on Rottnest Island. These were withdrawn from service and placed in storage in 1944, then were sold to a scrap merchant in 1963. However, the dealer never collected them, and the guns remained on site until 1980, when army reservists retrieved and refurbished them, with one on display outside the Army Museum of Western Australia. Another of the ship's guns was used on Thursday Island from 1940 to 1987.

In 2014 a shield removed from HMAS Adelaide during a refit in 1943 and dumped on a tip on the Mornington Peninsula, Victoria, was transported to Perth for refurbishment. A member of the Royal Australian Artillery Historical Society of Western Australia, which had been searching for such a shield for 20 years as a match for a 6-inch Mk XI naval gun it held from HMAS Sydney had spotted the shield at location. The naval gun and shield were installed at the Leighton Battery in September 2015 to replicate the original 6-inch guns at site.

== See also ==
- HMAS Sydney I - SMS Emden Memorial
