= HMS Dublin (1912) =

Chatham-class light cruiser

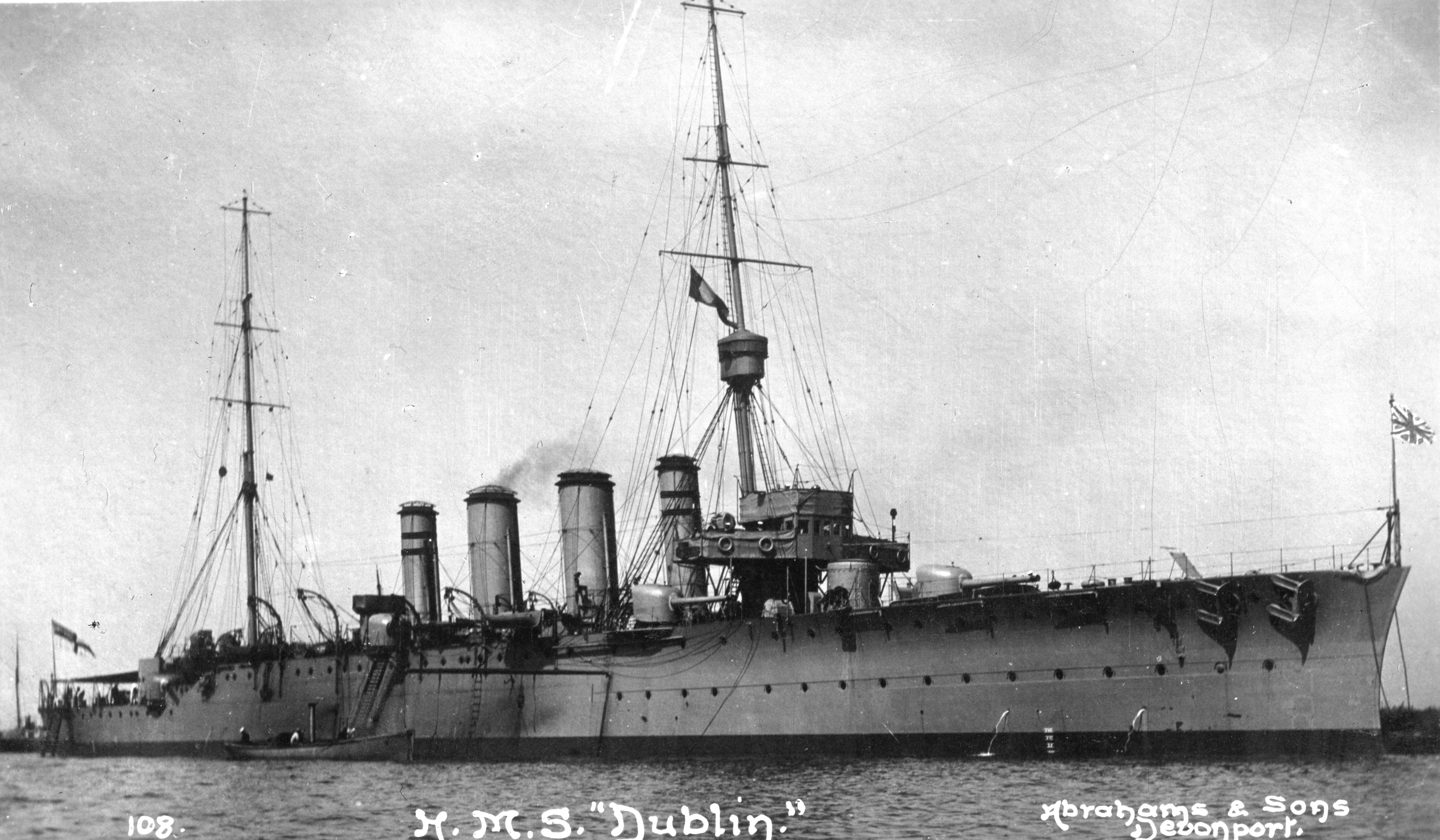
- Postcard of Dublin, probably from before the First World War

History

United Kingdom
- Name: Dublin
- Namesake: Dublin
- Builder: William Beardmore & Company, Dalmuir
- Laid down: 3 January 1911
- Launched: 30 April 1912
- Commissioned: March 1913
- Out of service: 1924
- Fate: Scrapped, July 1926
- Badge

General characteristics
- Class & type: Town-class light cruiser
- Displacement: 5,400 long tons (5,500 t)
- Length: 457 ft (139.3 m) (o/a)
- Beam: 49 ft (14.9 m)
- Draught: 16 ft 9 in (5.11 m)
- Depth: 26 ft (7.9 m)
- Installed power: 12 Yarrow boilers; 25,000 shp (19,000 kW)
- Propulsion: 4 screws; 2 steam turbine sets
- Speed: 25.5 knots (47.2 km/h; 29.3 mph)
- Range: 4,460 nmi (8,260 km; 5,130 mi) at 10 knots (19 km/h; 12 mph)
- Complement: 475
- Armament: 8 × 6 in (152 mm) guns; 4 × 3 pdr (1.9 in (47 mm)) guns; 2 × 21 in (533 mm) torpedo tubes
- Armour: Waterline belt: 2 in (51 mm); Deck: .375–1.5 in (10–38 mm); Conning tower: 4 in (102 mm)

HMS Dublin, together with Chatham and Southampton, was a Town-class light cruiser of the Chatham subgroup, each costing an average £334,053.

== Design and description ==
Dublin displaced 5,400 long tons (5,500 t) at normal load. The ship had an overall length of 457 feet (139.3 m), a beam of 49 feet (14.9 m) and a draught of 16 feet 9 inches (5.1 m). She was powered by four Parsons steam turbine sets, each driving one shaft, which produced a total of 25,000 shaft horsepower (19,000 kW) and gave a maximum speed of 25.5 knots (47.2 km/h; 29.3 mph). The engines were powered by 12 Yarrow boilers. The ship carried a maximum of 1,240 long tons (1,260 t) of coal and an additional 260 long tons (260 t) of fuel oil that was sprayed on the coal to increase its burn rate. At full capacity, she could steam for 4,460 nautical miles (8,260 km; 5,130 mi) at a speed of 10 knots (19 km/h; 12 mph). The ship's complement was 475 officers and ratings.

Her main armament consisted of eight BL 6-inch (152 mm) Mk XI guns in single pivot mounts, protected by gun shields. Four Vickers quick-firing (QF) three-pounder guns were fitted in the superstructure. The ship also mounted two submerged 21-inch (533 mm) torpedo tubes. A QF three-inch 20 cwt (Note: "Cwt" is the abbreviation for hundredweight, 20 cwt referring to the weight of the gun.) anti-aircraft gun was added in 1915 on the centreline on a mount between the funnels and the mainmast.

The ship's nickel steel waterline armor belt was 2 inches (51 mm) thick and was backed by the 1 inch (25 mm) thick side of the hull. Her deck was generally .375 inches (10 mm) thick, but increased to .75 inches (19 mm) over the machinery spaces, and 1.5 inches (38 mm) over the steering gear.

== Operational history ==
Dublin was laid down on 11 April 1911 by Wm. Beardmore & Company in Dalmuir (near Glasgow) Scotland. Dublin was launched on 30 April 1912 and completed in March 1913. She was initially assigned to the 1st Battle Squadron in 1913 and then to the 1st Light Cruiser Squadron in July 1913, operating in the Mediterranean. She was then reassigned to the 2nd Light Cruiser Squadron from September 1913 to the end of 1914.

=== Pursuit of Goeben ===
Captain John Kelly pursued the German battlecruiser Goeben to Messina (off the north coast of Sicily) on 4 August 1914 just prior to the outbreak of the First World War. On 6 August after having completed coaling, Dublin left Malta at 14:00 to join Rear-Admiral Ernest Troubridge's squadron. At 20:30 she received orders to obtain Goeben's course and sink her during the night, by torpedoes if possible. Observing at a distance, Kelly expected to engage around 03:30 but Goeben had unexpectedly altered course to the north. The chase was lost as a daylight attack would be suicidal; Goeben's largest guns could accurately fire explosive shells up to 10 miles (16 km) away.

=== Gallipoli and torpedoing ===
In February 1915, Dublin was sent to the Dardanelles and subsequently assisted Implacable's landing assault upon Gallipoli, on 25 April 1915 at X Beach. She was then sent to Brindisi in May 1915. While taking part in a sweep off the Albanian coast, and whilst escorted by French and Italian destroyers, Dublin was hit and damaged by a torpedo from the Austro-Hungarian Navy submarine U-4 on 9 June 1915. Dublin was able to get underway at 17 knots (31 km/h; 20 mph) and to return to Brindisi but was out of action for several months and had to return to the UK for refit.

=== In home waters ===
Dublin served in the 2nd Light Cruiser Squadron alongside Southampton, Birmingham and Nottingham with the Grand Fleet from 1916 to 1919. Now under Captain Albert Charles Scott (later Vice Admiral; HMS Dublin 1916–1918), she participated in the Battle of Jutland on 31 May 1916. During the subsequent night actions, Dublin fired 117 6-inch shells and, along with Southampton, attacked and sank a destroyer. Both ships, however, sustained severe damage. Three crew members were killed and 27 wounded when Dublin received five 5.9 shell inch hits from the cruiser SMS Elbing and eight 4.1-inch shell hits from Stuttgart (possibly also Frauenlob and Hamburg). Subsequent repairs to Dublin were not completed until 17 June.

On 3 May 1917 in the North Sea, Dublin with the Australian cruiser HMAS Sydney and four destroyers (Nepean, Obdurate, Pelican, Pylades), left Rosyth for a sweep between the mouths of the Forth and the Humber. The following day, during an action in the North Sea, Dublin observed the Zeppelin L 43 about 17 miles away to the east at 10:25, rapidly approaching a strange vessel. Both cruisers promptly made for the enemy, opening fire on it at extreme range. At 10:54 Dublin saw the track of a torpedo passing ahead of her. At 11:12 a submarine was sighted and at 11:15 another one was spotted, which fired two torpedoes at her. At 11:20 she sighted a third submarine, which she engaged with her guns and on which she dropped a depth-charge. The Zeppelin made a direct attack: making for the stern of Dublin and rising hastily as it flew, it endeavoured to obtain a position vertically above the cruiser in order to drop bombs on her - an attempt which was foiled by Dublin's hurried swerve to starboard.

=== Post-war career ===
Dublin was commissioned for the 6th squadron at the Africa Station from January 1920 until 1924, though she served for a short time in April with the 3rd squadron in the Mediterranean until being sent to the Reserve at Nore in 1924. She was sold for scrapping to J.J. King at Troon in July 1926, but she ran aground on the way to the breakers. She was refloated in July 1927 and broken up later that year.
