= Emden (disambiguation) =

Emden is a city in Lower Saxony.

Emden may also refer to:

== Places ==
- Emden, a town and seaport in Lower Saxony, Germany
- Emden, Saxony-Anhalt, a municipality in Saxony-Anhalt, Germany
- Emden, Illinois, U.S.
- Emden, Missouri, U.S.

== Ships ==
- SMS Emden (1908), a light cruiser in the German navy
  - How We Beat the Emden, a 1915 Australian silent film about battle with the ship
  - Our Emden, a 1926 silent film about the ship
  - The Exploits of the Emden, a 1928 Australian silent film with footage from Our Emden
  - Cruiser Emden, a 1932 film about the ship and remake of Our Emden
  - Die Männer der Emden, a 2012 film about the ship's crew
- SMS Emden (1916), a light cruiser in the German navy
- German cruiser Emden
- German frigate Emden (F221), a Köln-class frigate of the German Navy
- German frigate Emden (F210), a Bremen-class frigate of the German Navy
- German corvette Emden (F266), a Braunschweig-class corvette of the German Navy

== Other uses ==
- Emden (crater), a lunar crater
- Emden harbor, the harbor of Emden, Germany
- Emden Airport, an airport in Lower Saxony, Germany
- Kickers Emden, a German football club based in Emden
- Embden Goose or Emden, a breed of goose
- Emden Deep, the deepest part of the Philippine Trench, named after the German cruiser Emden

== People with the surname ==
- Alfred Brotherston Emden (1888–1979), English historian and principal of St Edmund Hall
- Alfred Charles Emden (1849–1911), British barrister and judge
- Bloeme Evers-Emden (1926–2016), Dutch lecturer and child psychologist
- Jacob Emden (1697–1776), German rabbi and Talmud scholar
- Max Emden (1874–1940), German-born Swiss businessman and art collector
- Robert Emden (1862–1940), Swiss astrophysicist and meteorologist

== See also ==
- Van Emden, people with this surname
- Embden (disambiguation)
- Lane–Emden equation, an equation in astrophysics
- List of ships named Emden
- D'Emden v Pedder, an Australian court case
