= For the Honour of Australia =

- Directed by: Monte Luke; Alfred Rolfe
- Starring: Boyd Irwin; Charles Villiers
- Cinematography: Maurice Bertel
- Production companies: J. C. Williamson Ltd; Australasian Films
- Release date: 1916 (UK)
- Country: Australia
- Languages: Silent film English intertitles

For the Honour of Australia is a 1916 Australian silent war drama film composed of footage from two 1915 Australian silent films, For Australia and How We Beat the Emden, plus the documentary How We Fought the Emden.

== Plot ==
Jack Lane joins the Royal Australian Navy and trains on Tingira. His brother Stanley discovers a German spy ring amongst the social set in Sydney. They capture him and take him to a secret island outpost. Germans are about to destroy an Allied radio station but it manages to alert HMAS Sydney beforehand and the ship attacks German sailors. A half-caste islander, Kana, leads HMAS Sydney to the spies' island. A landing party attacks and kills the spies but Kana is killed.

== Cast ==
- Boyd Irwin as Stanley Lane
- Gwen Burroughs as Mrs De Winter
- Alma Rock Phillips as Kana
- Charles Villiers as Carl Hoffman
- Percy Walshe

== Production ==
For Australia and How We Fought the Emden were films made by rival companies but were put together for release in Britain. It is unsure what company did this but the films were made with the approval of both the Australian and British governments.
