= Pugliese (surname) =

Pugliese is an Italian surname meaning "from Puglia". Notable people with the surname include:

- Aaron Pugliese, American writer
- Anthony Pugliese, American businessman and real estate developer
- Antonio Pugliese (1941–2000), Canadian professional wrestler (aka Tony Parisi)
- Armando Pugliese (1947–2024), Italian stage director and playwright
- Caroline Pugliese (1865–1940), Australian theatre owner and film producer
- Christopher Pugliese, American realist artist
- Clemente Pugliese Levi (1855–1936), Italian painter
- Dina Pugliese (born 1974), Canadian television personality
- Frank Pugliese, American television writer and artistic director
- Giacomino Pugliese (fl. 13th century), Italian poet
- Gianluca Pugliese (born 1997), Argentine footballer
- Giuseppe Pugliese (born 1983), Italian footballer
- Humbert Pugliese (1884–1955), Australian film exhibitor and producer
- Jeanette Pugliese (1939–2022), American murderer (aka Sharon Kinne)
- Jim Pugliese (born 1952), American percussionist
- Joseph Pugliese (born 1984), American musician (aka Joe Pug)
- Juan Carlos Pugliese (1915–1994), Argentine politician
- Julia Jones-Pugliese (1909–1993), American national champion fencer and coach
- Karyn Pugliese, Canadian investigative journalist and professor
- Marcelo Pugliese (born 1968), Argentine discus thrower
- Mario Pugliese (born 1996), Italian footballer
- Nick Pugliese (born 1985), American baseball player
- Nicola Pugliese (1944–2012), Italian author and journalist
- Oronzo Pugliese (1910–1990), Italian football manager
- Osvaldo Pugliese (1905–1995), Argentine tango musician
- Pasquale Pugliese (born 1952), Italian racing cyclist
- Patri J. Pugliese (1950–2007), American historian of science, dance, and fencing
- Rick Pugliese (1952–2020), Canadian water polo player
- Rocco Pugliese, American lobbyist
- Rose Pugliese, American politician
- Sergio Pugliese (1908–1965), Italian screenwriter, playwright and journalist
- Ugo Pugliese (born 1961), Italian politician
- Umberto Pugliese (1880–1961), Italian general and naval architect
- Valentino Pugliese (born 1997), Swiss footballer

== See also ==
- Pugliese (disambiguation)
