= Bombardment of Madras =

1914 engagement of World War I

- Part of the Asian and Pacific theatre of World War I
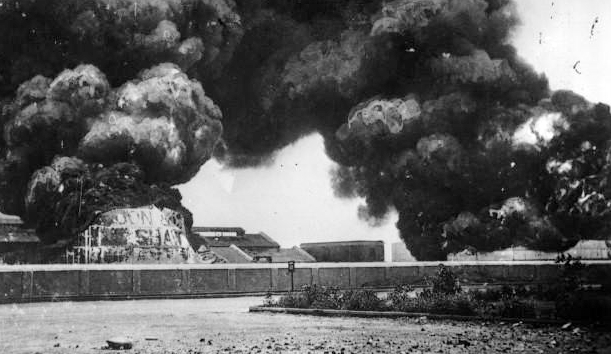
- Oil tanks on fire in the harbour following the bombardment of Madras by SMS Emden
Date	22 September 1914
Location	Madras, Madras Presidency, India
Result	German victory

Belligerents
India	(German Empire) Germany

Commanders and leaders
Unknown	(German Empire) Karl von Müller

Strength
Unknown	Light cruiser Emden

Casualties and losses
1 steamer sunk 5 killed 26 wounded	None

The bombardment of Madras was an engagement of the First World War, at Madras (now Chennai), British India. The bombardment was initiated by the German light cruiser Emden at the outset of the war in 1914.

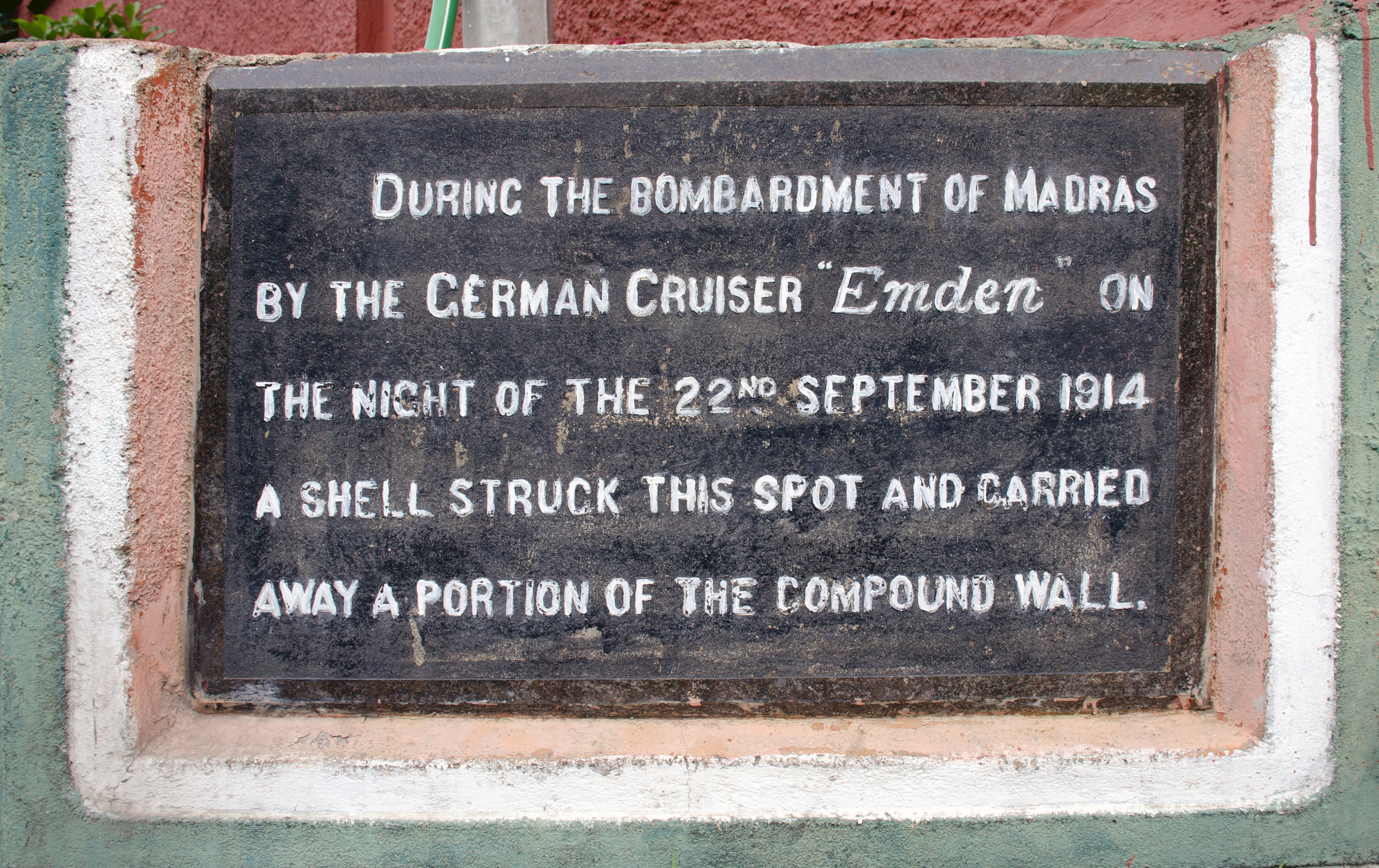
Emden Plaque at Madras High Court, Chennai,Madras

With Captain Karl von Müller in command, on the night of 22 September 1914, SMS Emden quietly approached the city of Madras on the southeastern coast of the Indian peninsula. As he later wrote, "I had this shelling in view simply as a demonstration to arouse interest among the Indian population, to disturb English commerce, to diminish English prestige." After entering the Madras harbour area, Müller illuminated six large oil tanks belonging to the Burmah Oil Company with his searchlights, then fired at a range of 3,000 yards. After ten minutes of firing, Emden had hit five of the tanks and destroyed 346,000 gallons of fuel, and the cruiser then successfully retreated.

Soon the word Emden entered the Tamil and Malayalam dictionaries and was used to describe someone powerful, frightening and with a wicked intent.

== References and external links ==
- Keegan, John (October 2004). Intelligence in War (1 ed.). New York: Vintage Books. ISBN 0-375-70046-3.
- The Last Corsair: The Story of The Emden by Dan van der Vat, 1984. ISBN 0-586-06265-3
- The Last Gentleman of War. The Raider Exploits of the Cruiser Emden by R. K. Lochner, Naval Institute Press:. 1988. ISBN 0-87021-015-7
- The Last Cruise of the Emden: The Amazing True WWI Story of a German-Light Cruiser and Her Courageous Crew by Edwin Palmer Hoyt, Globe Pequot Press, 2001 ISBN 978-1-58574-382-7
- Hellmuth von Mücke, Helene Schimmelfennig White (1917). The Emden. Ritter.
- Karl Friedrich Max von Müller: Captain of the Emden During World War I by John M. Taylor
- New York Times: "German Cruiser Emden Destroyed", 11 November 1914 a PDF of NYT's report on Emden's sinking along with some praise for its captain.
- New York Times: "Captain of Emden Killed?", a PDF of a NYT article dated 13 April 1921
- "Junk-Emden". Time. 6 May 1929. Archived from the original on 27 October 2010.
- Cruisers EMDEN, Frigates EMDEN - 5 warships named EMDEN until today (in German)
- World War I Naval Combat
- Karl Friedrich Max von Müller: Captain of the Emden During World War I
- How German cruiser ‘Emden’ struck terror in the heart of the British Empire, and became a Tamil word. The Hindu. 23 February 2020.
