= Die Männer der Emden =

2012 film

- Directed by: Berengar Pfahl
- Written by: Berengar Pfahl; Axel Ricke
- Produced by: Berengar Pfahl; Axel Ricke
- Starring: Ken Duken; Felicitas Woll; Sebastian Blomberg
- Cinematography: Erich Krenek
- Edited by: Annemarie Bremer
- Music by: Matthias Raue
- Release dates: 6 June 2012 (Emden Film Festival); 31 January 2013 (Germany)
- Running time: 144 minutes
- Country: Germany
- Language: German

Die Männer der Emden ("The Men of the Emden", English title: Odyssey of Heroes) is a 2012 German war adventure film directed and co-written by Berengar Pfahl that is an account of members of the crew of SMS Emden making their way back to Germany after the Battle of Cocos (1914). The film was shot in Greece, Sri Lanka, Tunisia, Malta and Germany and appeared as both a miniseries and a feature film.

== Plot ==
The film begins at the Imperial German naval station at the Kiautschou Bay concession in China. Two officers of SMS Emden are competing for the affection of Maria von Plettenberg, who lives with her father, mother and sister in Tsingtau.

When war is declared the Emden has a variety of successful naval engagements in the Pacific and Indian oceans. Soon after a raiding party is sent ashore to destroy a British wireless installation in the Cocos Islands, Emden engages HMAS Sydney but the vessel is sunk with many of the crew captured. Rather than surrender, the shore party seizes the schooner Ayesha and decides to sail back to the Kiautschou Bay concession to fight again. The Ayesha; a topsail schooner was owned by Clunies-Ross of Cocos Keeling Islands. Mücke and his men had sailed from Direction Island.

When the crew arrives in the neutral Dutch East Indies they hear that the concession has been captured by the Japanese. With their fates unknown to each other, the men of Emden and the von Plettenberg family make their way back to Germany.

== Cast ==
- Ken Duken as Karl Overbeck
- Felicitas Woll as Maria von Plettenberg
- Sebastian Blomberg as Hellmuth von Mücke
- Jan Henrik Stahlberg as Friedrich von Schulau
- Oliver Korittke as Maat Kluthe
- Verena Plangger as Elisabeth von Plettenberg
- Gerd Wameling as Wilhelm von Plettenberg
- Antje Charlotte Sieglin as Wilhelmine von Plettenberg
- Wolfgang Winkler as Dr. Bartel
- Sibel Kekilli as Salima Bey
- Kriz Chris Henri Harriz as Father
- Matthias Schloo as Manfred von Manstein
- Peter Sodann as Generaloberst von Leutenburg
- Michael Lott as Matrose Hilgert
- Ronald Top as Neutralitätsoffizier Vandenberg
- Sheri Hagen as Antonia
- Ian T. Dickinson as Interrorgation Officer
- Shaun Lawton as John Sidney Clunies-Ross, Governor of the Cocos Islands
- Christian Näthe as Matrose Kolkmann
- Andreas Pape as Johannes Burgwächter
- Ercan Karacayli as Habib

== See also ==
- How We Beat the Emden (1915)
- Our Emden (1926)
- The Exploits of the Emden (1928)
- Cruiser Emden (1932)
