= For Australia =

- Directed by: Monte Luke assistant Martyn Keith
- Written by: Martyn Keith
- Starring: Boyd Irwin; Charles Villers
- Cinematography: Maurice Bertel
- Production company: J. C. Williamson Ltd
- Release dates: 18 October 1915 (Melbourne); 6 December 1915 (Australia)
- Running time: 4,000 feet
- Country: Australia
- Languages: Silent film English intertitles

For Australia is a 1915 Australian silent film directed by Monte Luke.

== Plot ==
A newspaper journalist, Stanley Lane (Boyd Irwin), discovers a German spy ring in Sydney led by Carl Hoffman (Charles Villiers). Lane is captured and imprisoned by Germans on an uncharted Pacific Island.

With the help of half-caste Samoan girl Kana (Alma Rock Phillips) he escapes and destroys a German wireless station in Samoa. He is re-captured and tied to a tree in a crocodile-infested swamp, but Kana saves him again. Later, HMAS Sydney invades the island and Hoffman runs into the swamp and is eaten by crocodiles.

== Cast ==
- Alma Rock Phillips as Kana
- Boyd Irwin as Stanley Lane
- Gwen Burroughs as Mrs De Winter
- Charles Villiers as Carl Hoffman
- Percy Walshe

== Production ==
The film was made with the co-operation of the Australian government. It was mostly shot in and around Sydney with some scenes at an aboriginal mission at Brewarrina in northern New South Wales.

== Release ==
The film was previewed in Melbourne on 18 October 1915. The Winner stated that:

The picture is a distinctly good example of what can be accomplished in locally-made films. The story is interesting... and has the right grip for picture purposes. Some fine natural scenery has been secured for many of the sections, and the Sydney-Emden fight has been cleverly worked out. On the whole, Mr Monte Luke, the director, and all associated with him in the production, have every reason to be proud of their work.

However the film was not a success at the box office.

== For the Honour of Australia ==
The movie was combined with another film, How We Beat the Emden (1915), and the documentary How We Fought the Emden, to make a new movie for release in Britain called For the Honour of Australia (1916). A copy of this survives today.
