= Struck Oil =

Struck Oil is an 1874 play set during the American Civil War and a 1919 Australian silent film, now considered lost. The play, which introduced Maggie Moore to Australian theatre-goers, was popular with the Australian public and the basis of J. C. Williamson's success as a theatre entrepreneur. A film based on the play and directed by Franklyn Barrett was produced in 1919.

== Plot ==
John Stofel is a Dutch shoemaker who has settled in America, and has a daughter, Lizzie. During the US Civil War, John goes off to fight, in the place of a cowardly deacon who gives him the title deed of a farm. John returns from the war wounded and insane. Oil is discovered on the farm and the deacon tries to take the land back. However, John regains his memory, finds the hidden title deed and the deacon is forced to give up his claim to the Stofels.

== The play ==
Struck Oil
- Original language: English
- Written by: Sam Smith; Clay Greene; J. C. Williamson
- Genre: melodrama

Premiere
- Date: 23 February 1874
- Place: Salt Lake City

=== Origins ===
J. C. Williamson was an American leading actor who had toured Australia and just married Maggie Moore when he read a one-act play called The Dead, or Five Years Away by Irish miner and amateur playwright Sam Smith. It was originally a one-man piece about John Stofel, similar to Rip Van Winkle. Williamson bought the play outright for $100, had it rewritten by his friend Clay M. Greene, and retitled it Struck Oil. He then took the play to Salt Lake City where Williamson claims to have re-written the last act himself.

=== Popularity ===
Williamson and Moore appeared in the play when it made its debut on 23 February 1874. It was a hit and they then took it to Australia where it debuted in Melbourne at the Theatre Royal on 1 August 1874.

The play was a great success, ultimately selling 93,000 tickets in a city of 110,000 people, and proved equally popular around the rest of the country. What was meant to be a 12-week tour of Australia ended up lasting for fifteen months and netting Williamson £15,000.

Williamson used this money to launch his career as a theatre manager and Maggie Moore became one of the most popular performers on the Australian stage.

In 1880 L. M. Bayless, a rival theatre manager, mounted a production of Struck Oil at the Academy of Music, Adelaide, but was deterred by Williamson's threat of legal action although he may have been breaking no (South Australian) law.

Williamson and Moore toured with the play in India, the US, Europe and Britain, as well as frequently reviving it in Australia. In 1894 Moore left Williamson and formed her own theatre company; they divorced in 1899. Williamson tried to stop her from appearing in the play but was unsuccessful and she continued to revive it throughout her career until her death in 1926.

== The film ==
Struck Oil is a 1919 Australian silent film directed by Franklyn Barrett, based on the stage play. It is considered a lost film.

Struck Oil
- Based on: play by Sam Smith, Clay Greene and J. C. Williamson
- Produced by: Humbert Pugliese
- Starring: Maggie Moore; Harry Roberts
- Cinematography: Ernest Higgins
- Production company: Australian Art Productions
- Release date: 20 October 1919
- Running time: 7 reels
- Country: Australia
- Languages: Silent film; English intertitles

=== Cast ===
- Maggie Moore as Lizzie Stofel
- Harry Roberts as John Stofel
- Percy Walshe as Deacon Skinner
- Boyd Irwin
- David Edelsten

Maggie Moore married Harry Roberts in 1902 and he became her acting and business partner, appearing with her in several productions of Struck Oil. By the time she appeared in the film version of the play she was well into her sixties.

=== Production ===
The film was shot in Sydney in August and September 1919. It is likely the budget was low.

=== Reception ===
The film was not a success at the box office, which may be explained by the lack of access Caroline Pugliese and Humbert Pugliese had to other theatres around Australia.

Variety gave the film a scathing review saying "the redeeming feature is the photography, otherwise the entire film should be scrapped."
