= Karl von Müller =

German naval officer and politician (1873–1923)

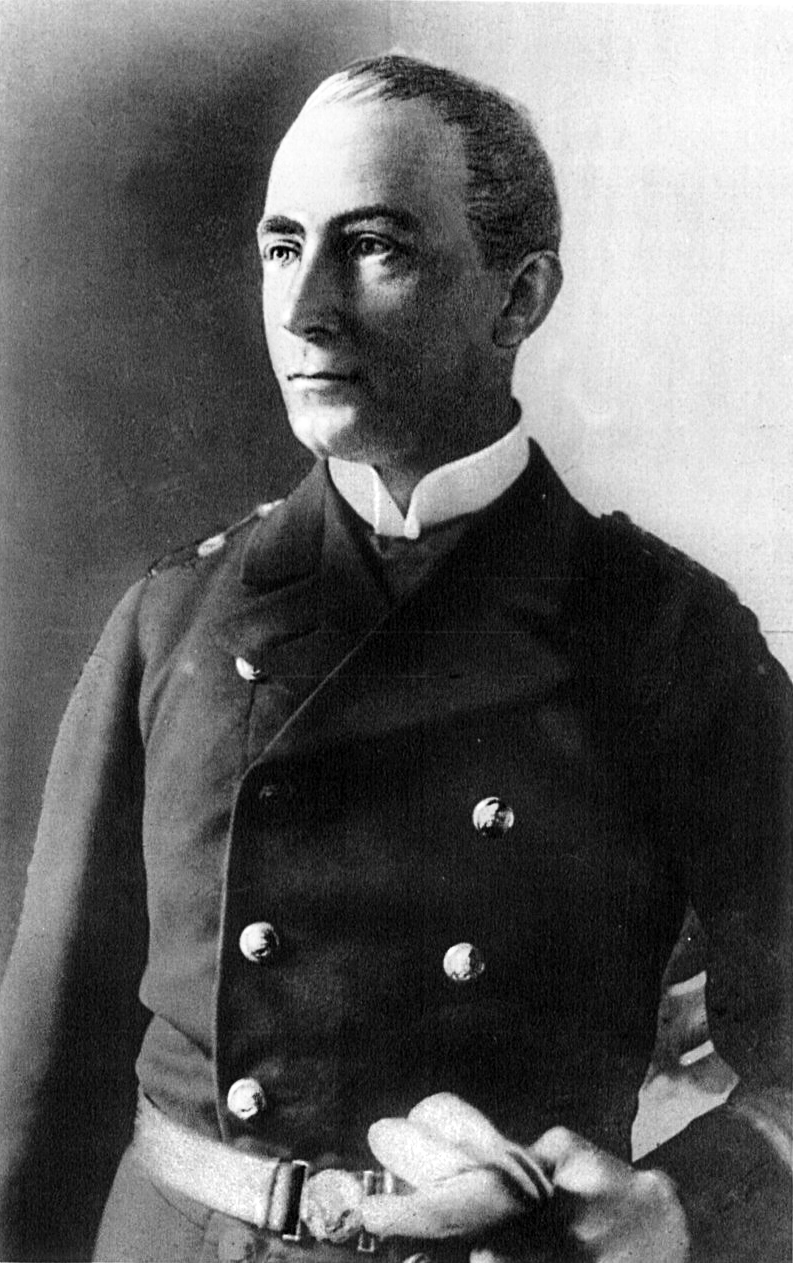
- Born: 16 June 1873; Hanover, Prussia, German Empire
- Died: 11 March 1923 (aged 49); Braunschweig, Weimar Republic
- Military career
- Allegiance: German Empire
- Branch: Imperial German Navy
- Service years: 1891–1919
- Rank: Kapitän zur See
- Commands: SMS Emden
- Conflicts: Second Chinese Revolution; First World War: Bombardment of Madras; Battle of Penang; Battle of Cocos
- Awards: Iron Cross 1st class Pour le Mérite

Karl Friedrich Max von Müller (16 June 1873 – 11 March 1923) was a German naval officer who was the captain of a commerce raider, the light cruiser SMS Emden during the First World War.

== Early life and career ==
The son of a colonel in the Prussian Army, Müller was born in Hanover. After attending gymnasia at Hanover and Kiel, he entered the military academy at Plön in Schleswig-Holstein, but transferred to the German Imperial Navy at Easter 1891. He served first on the training ship SMS Stosch, then on the training ship Gneisenau on a voyage to the Americas. He became signal lieutenant of the old ironclad SMS Baden (1880) in October 1894, and later transferred in the same capacity to her sister ship Sachsen.

Müller was promoted to Oberleutnant zur See and posted to the unprotected cruiser Schwalbe. During Schwalbe's deployment to German East Africa, he caught malaria, which troubled him for the remainder of his life.

After returning to Germany in 1900, Müller served on shore before becoming second gunnery officer of the pre-dreadnought battleship Kaiser Wilhelm II. An appointment to the staff of Admiral Prince Heinrich of Prussia proved to be the turning point to career success. After receiving high praise and assessments from his superiors, he was promoted to the rank of Korvettenkapitän in December 1908, and assigned to the Reichsmarineamt (Imperial Navy Office) in Berlin, where he impressed Grand Admiral Alfred von Tirpitz.

== In command ==
As a reward for his admiralty work in Berlin, Müller was given command of the light cruiser Emden in the spring of 1913. Soon he achieved fame and notoriety in both the German and other imperial powers' newspapers for initiative and skill in shelling rebellious forts along the Yangtze, at Nanking. He was awarded the Order of the Royal Crown (Third Class) with Swords.

At the outbreak of the First World War, Emden was anchored in the German base at Qingdao. She steamed out to sea on the evening of 31 July 1914, and on 4 August she intercepted and captured the Russian mail steamer Ryazan, the first prize taken by the Imperial German Navy (Kaiserliche Marine) in the Great War. Emden then made rendezvous with the East Asia Squadron of Admiral Count Maximilian von Spee in the Mariana Islands.

It was during a conference on the island of Pagan that Müller proposed a single light cruiser of the squadron be detached to raid Allied commerce in the Indian Ocean, while the remainder of Spee's squadron continued to steam east across the Pacific. Müller and Emden were given the assignment.

In the following twelve weeks Emden and Müller achieved a reputation for daring and chivalry unequaled by any other German ship or captain. Müller was highly scrupulous about trying to avoid inflicting non-combatant and civilian casualties. While taking fourteen prizes, the only merchant sailors killed by Emden's guns were five victims of a bombardment of Madras that targeted British oil tanks and a merchant ship, despite the care Müller had taken to establish lines of fire that would minimise the risk of hitting civilian areas of the city. Emden also sank the Russian cruiser Zhemchug and the French destroyer Mousquet during a raid on Penang in Malaya. Thirty-six French survivors from Mousquet were rescued by Emden, and when three men died of their injuries they were buried at sea with full honours. The remaining Frenchmen were transferred to a British steamer, Newburn, which had been stopped by the German ship, but not attacked, so as to enable them to be transported to Sabang, Sumatra, in the neutral Dutch East Indies.

== Defeat and captivity ==
When Emden sent a landing party ashore to destroy a radio station at Port Refuge in the Keeling Islands on 8 November 1914, she was finally cornered by the Australian light cruiser HMAS Sydney and was defeated in the Battle of Cocos by the Australian ship's heavier guns (6-inch with Emden only 4-inch guns)). Müller, with the rest of his surviving crew, was captured and taken to Fort Verdala, Malta. A detachment of his crew which had gone ashore evaded capture and escaped to Germany under the leadership of Emden's first officer, Hellmuth von Mücke. On 8 October 1916, two days after the German resumption of unrestricted submarine warfare, Müller was separated from the rest of the Emden prisoners and taken to England, where he was interned at a prisoner of war camp for German officers located at the Midlands Agricultural and Dairy College (now the Sutton Bonington Campus of the University of Nottingham). In 1917 he led an escape of 21 prisoners through a tunnel, but was recaptured. The climate of England disagreed with his malaria, and he was eventually sent to the Netherlands for treatment, as part of a humanitarian exchange of prisoners. In October 1918, a month before the armistice, he was repatriated to Germany.

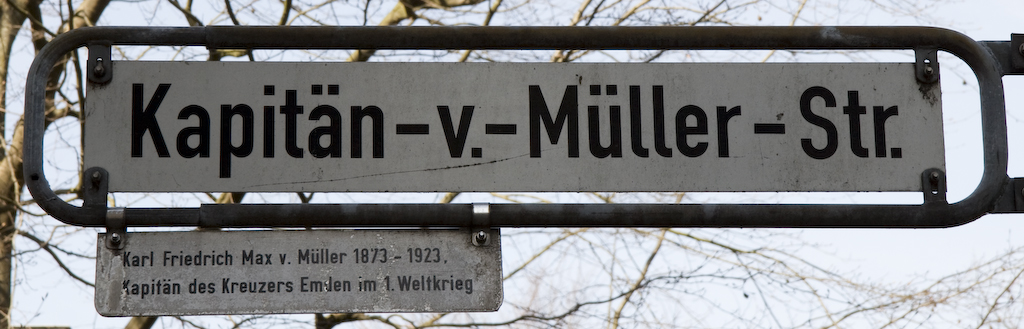
Kapitan v. Müller Street in Hanover

== Final years ==
Müller was awarded the Pour le Mérite (or Blue Max) and finally promoted to Kapitän zur See. In early 1919, he retired from the Navy on grounds of ill health and settled in Blankenburg. He politely refused to write a book detailing his war service and exploits. He was elected to the state parliament of the Free State of Brunswick on an anti-class platform as a member of the German National People's Party. He died at Brunswick suddenly, probably weakened by frequent malarial bouts, on 11 March 1923.

== References and links ==
- The Last Corsair: The Story of The Emden by Dan van der Vat, 1984. ISBN 0-586-06265-3
- The Last Gentleman of War. The Raider Exploits of the Cruiser Emden by R. K. Lochner, Naval Institute Press:. 1988. ISBN 0-87021-015-7
- The Last Cruise of the Emden: The Amazing True WWI Story of a German-Light Cruiser and Her Courageous Crew by Edwin Palmer Hoyt, Globe Pequot Press, 2001 ISBN 978-1-58574-382-7
- Hellmuth von Mücke, Helene Schimmelfennig White (1917). The "Emden,". Ritter.
- Karl Friedrich Max von Müller: Captain of the Emden During World War I by John M. Taylor
- New York Times: German Cruiser Emden Destroyed, November 11, 1914 a PDF of NYT's report on Emden's sinking along with some praise for its captain.
- German cruiser 'Emden' struck terror in the heart of the British Empire, and became a Tamil word, February 22, 2020
- New York Times: Captain of Emden Killed?, a PDF of an NYT article dated April 13, 1921
- "Junk-Emden". Time Magazine. 6 May 1929. Archived from the original on 27 October 2010.
- Diving Pulu Keeling National Park and the Emden, A story about diving on the remains of the wreck of the Emden, along with pictures and a brief account of her final battle.
