= The Church and the Woman =

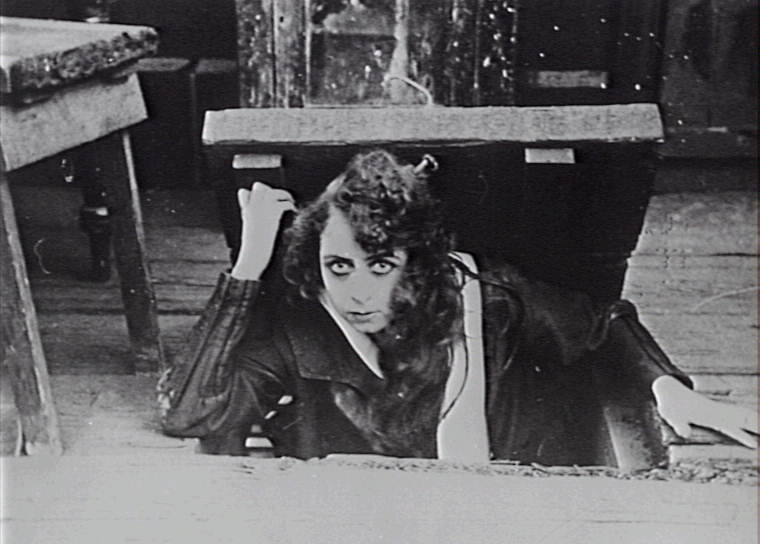
- Lottie Lyell in The Church and the Woman
- Directed by: Raymond Longford
- Written by: Raymond Longford
- Based on: the novel 'A Priest's Secret' by Edmund Finn
- Produced by: Humbert Pugliese
- Starring: Lottie Lyell
- Cinematography: Ernest Higgins
- Edited by: Ernest Higgins
- Production company: Longford-Pugliese
- Distributed by: Caroline Frances Pugliese
- Release date: 13 October 1917
- Running time: 7,000 feet
- Country: Australia
- Languages: Silent film; English intertitles

The Church and the Woman is a 1917 Australian silent film directed by Raymond Longford set against the background of sectarianism in Australia. It is considered a lost film.

== Synopsis ==
Eileen Shannon falls in love with Dr Burton. However he is a Protestant and her strongly Catholic father John refuses to give his consent to marriage between them.

Eileen pleads to her brother Darcy, a Catholic priest, for his help, but he does not support mixed marriages either.

John is murdered and Dr Burton is arrested for the crime and sentenced to death. The real murderer confesses to Darcy in the confessional. Unable to break the confidence of the confessional, Darcy admits to the murder and Dr Burton is freed. The murderer eventually confesses and Eileen marries Dr Burton.

== Cast ==
- Lottie Lyell as Eileen Shannon
- Boyd Irwin as Dr Sidney Burton
- Nada Conrade as Helen Burton
- J.P. O'Neill as Mike Feeney
- Harry Roberts as Father Darcy Shannon
- Percy Walshe as John Shannon
- Roland Watts-Phillips
- Pat McGrath
- George K. Chesterton Bonar

== Production ==
The movie was the first of three financed by exhibitor Humbert Pugliese and his mother Caroline. Shooting began in March 1917 with location filming at the Sacred Heart Church, Darlinghurst, Catholic Riverview College, Sydney, and Wentworth House, Vaucluse. A scene depicting a Catholic mass was filmed not by Protestant Longford but by his Catholic assistant, Pat McGrath.

== Lawsuits ==
The production and distribution of the film was notable for the large number of lawsuits associated with it.

=== The Monk and the Woman ===
The producer of the film The Monk and the Woman sued Humbert Pugliese for copyright infringement. This was resolved when Pugliese agreed not to advertise The Church and the Woman in the press or on noticeboards without adding the words: "The film must not be confused with the film of the play entitled The Monk and the Woman."

=== A Priest's Secret ===
Later on the writer Edmund Finn succeeded in getting an injunction stopping the film being distributed on the grounds it was adapted from his novel, The Priest's Secret. Pugliese, who hadn't written the script, denied he had ever read the novel but Justice Street in the Equity Court of New South Wales found that there were many similarities to Longford's script and ordered that Finn was entitled to an injunction, an account of profits, and an order for the delivering up of negatives.

Pugliese appealed this decision in the Supreme Court but was unsuccessful. The court held that after comparing the film's script with the novel, it was clear the former had been adapted from the latter – the main incidents of the plot were the same, long passages in the script were taken verbatim from the novel, and there was one passage on page seven of the script where Longford used the name "Martin" when speaking of the character in his scenario, "Mike Feeny", who was obviously taken from the character, "Martin Sullivan", in the novel.

The film was re-released with Edmund Finn credited as the author of the original novel.

=== The Church and the Nun ===
Pugliese and his Brisbane exhibitors sued a company for exhibiting a film under the title of The Church and the Nun. The court ruled in their favour, deciding that the other film had to make clear in advertising it was a different movie from The Church and the Woman.

=== Ernest Higgins ===
The cinematographer of the film, Ernest Higgins, sued Pugliese for unpaid wages of almost £700, mostly for work on this film, and the jury found in his favour.

== Reception ==
Despite its legal troubles, the film was a popular success at the box office.

== See also ==
- List of lost films
