= Embden =

Embden may refer to:

== Places ==
- Embden, an ancient name of the city of Emden, Germany
- Embden, Maine, United States
- Embden, North Dakota, United States

== Other uses ==
- Embden (goose), a German breed of domestic goose

== People with the surname ==
- Gustav Embden (1874–1933), German physiological chemist
- David van Embden (1875–1962), Dutch politician

== See also ==
- Emden (disambiguation)
