= Ayesha (ship) =

Coordinates: 3°14′S 100°35′E

- SMS Ayesha

History

British Empire
- Name: Ayesha
- Launched: 1907
- Fate: Captured by landing party from SMS Emden

German Empire
- Name: SMS Ayesha
- Commissioned: 9 November 1914
- Fate: Scuttled 16 December 1914

General characteristics
- Class & type: Schooner
- Tonnage: 97 grt
- Length: 30 m (98 ft 5 in)
- Beam: 7.5 m (24 ft 7 in)
- Propulsion: 3 masts
- Complement: 6 (peacetime); 47 (as a prize crew)

The Ayesha owned by Clunies-Ross of Cocos Keeling Islands was a wooden topsail schooner, which was commandeered by a landing party of the German light cruiser SMS Emden. This landing party was able to escape being taken as prisoners of war, in November 1914, after their ship was destroyed in a battle with the Australian light cruiser HMAS Sydney.

== History ==
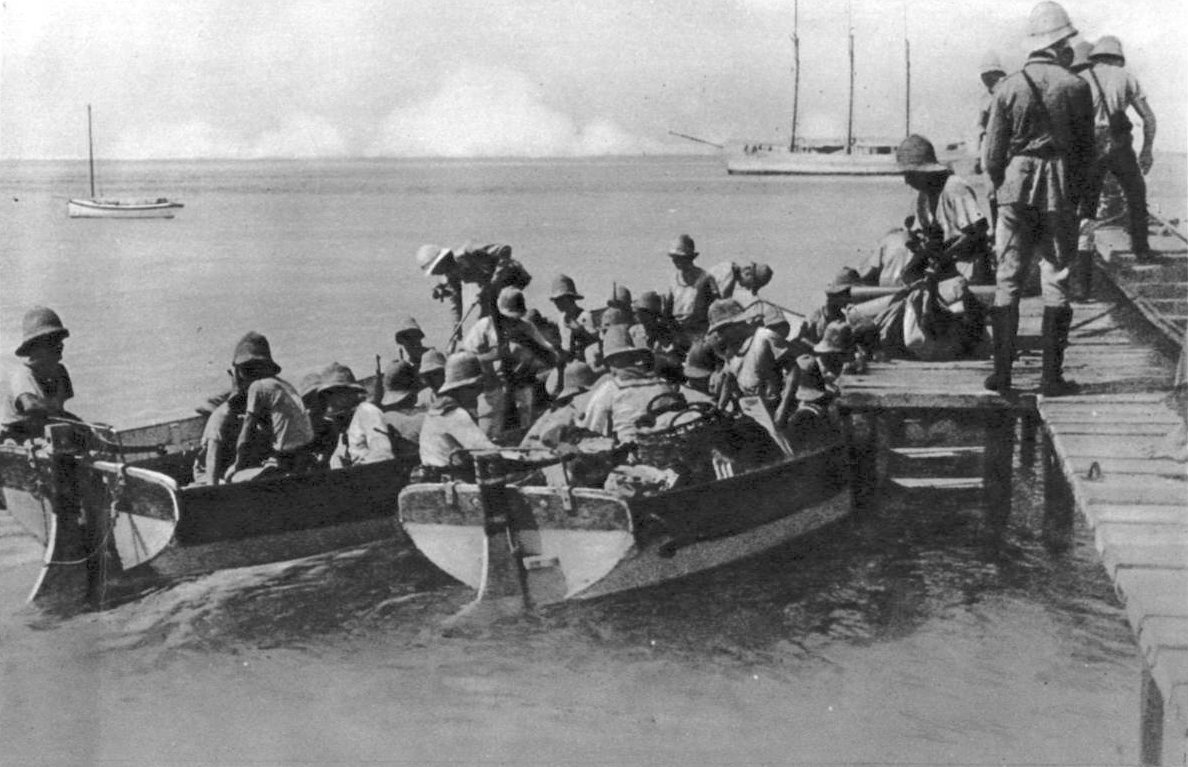
Emden's landing party going ashore on Direction Island; the three-masted Ayesha is visible in the background

The Ayesha owned by the Clunies-Ross family of the Cocos keeling Islands was a 30 metre long, 7.5 metre wide three-masted topsail schooner of 97 gross register tons. It originally served as a supply vessel in the British occupation of the Cocos as well as a transport for copra to Batavia in the Dutch East Indies. At that time the crew consisted of one captain and five men. Because of the operation of a steamer connection in the area, the ship was no longer used and was dismantled in the port of Port Refuge, Direction Island.

On 9 November 1914, a landing party of the German Imperial Navy's light cruiser Emden was on the island to attack the local cable and radio station. As this raid was taking place, their ship was attacked by the Australian light cruiser HMAS Sydney. During that battle, Emden was beached and set on fire. The remainder of the crew, not already onshore, was captured or died. To escape from the island, the landing party under the command of Lieutenant Hellmuth von Mücke seized possession of the Ayesha. The crew now consisted of three officers, six sergeants, and 38 sailors.

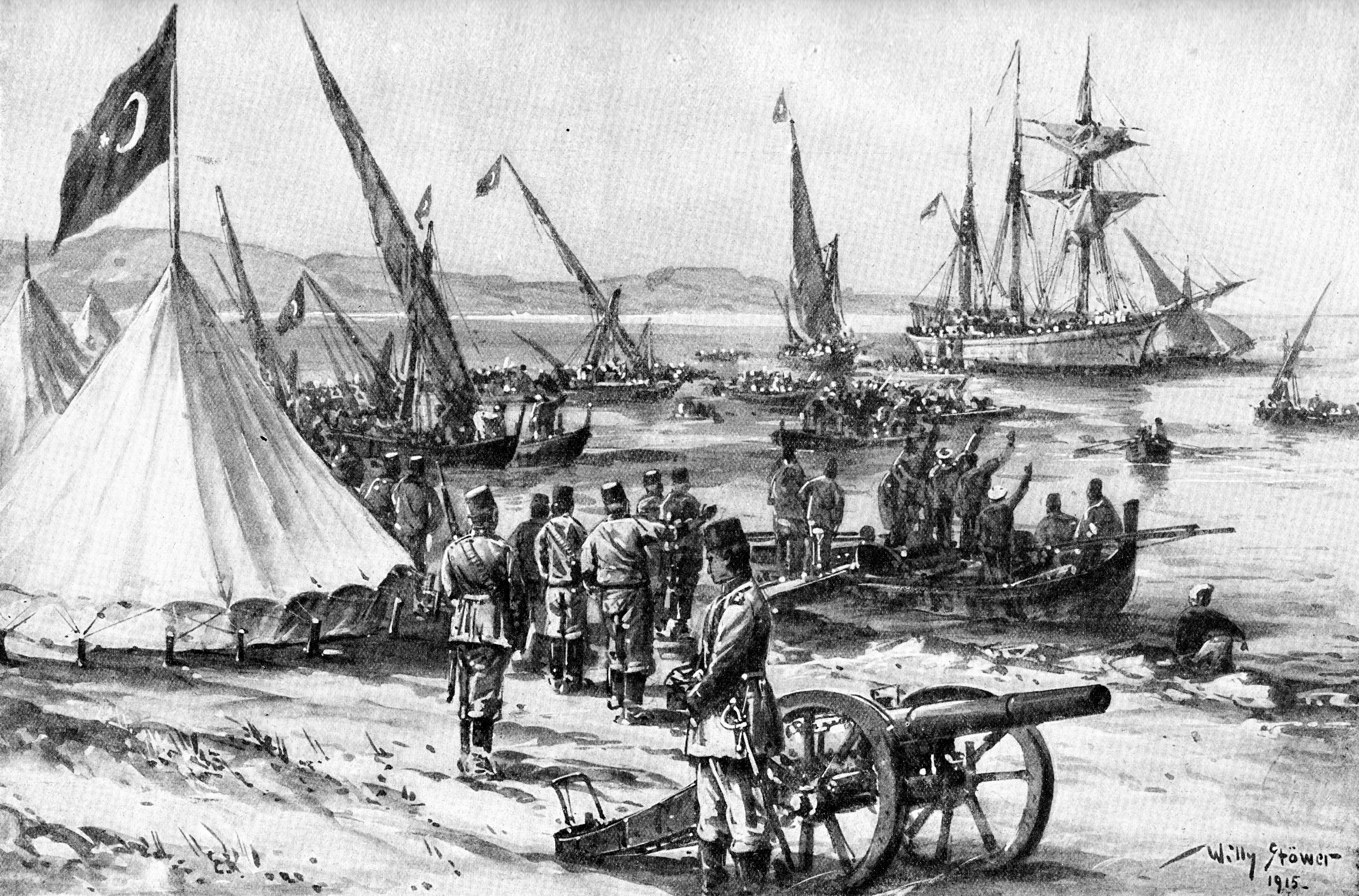
SMS Ayesha before Hodeida in January 1915. Painting by Willy Stöwer 1915 In fact, the Ayesha had previously been scuttled weeks before in the Indian Ocean, and the Emden landing party was transported on the steamship Choising. The picture was probably no longer published after 1916.

The British personnel of the radio station provided Mücke with food to take on the ship. The Ayesha was in bad shape, with the seals of the seacocks having been removed, and the bilge pumps not working properly, it was constantly taking on water. The wood of this confiscated sailing ship was very rotten and leaking. The four drinking water tanks could not be cleaned, and the water in three of them was contaminated. The hold was loaded with 2,000 rounds of ammunition, 29 Mauser model 88 and 98 rifles, each with 60 rounds and 24 pistols. Thus equipped, the crew escaped being captured by HMAS Sydney. Despite these shortcomings, the Ayesha reached Padang on the west coast of Sumatra on 27 November. Since this was a Dutch port, and due to neutrality provisions, the Ayesha had to leave within 24 hours, since she was now a vessel of the German Imperial Navy.

During the time in Padang, Mücke succeeded in meeting with the German Consul, where he was slipped a note with the coordinates for a meeting with a German merchant ship. After leaving Padang, the Ayesha met the North German Lloyd steamer, Choising, on 14 December. The crew moved on to the steamer, and Ayesha was scuttled on 16 December 1914 at 16:58 hours, after a 1709-mile trip.

After scuttling the Ayesha, the crew was taken to Arabia to begin an overland trek that ended in Constantinople in the Ottoman Empire in May 1915. From there, the crew was able to return to Germany.

== Movie ==
- In the 2012 feature film, The Men of Emden, the Ayesha is portrayed by the schooner Raja Laut.

== Literature ==
- Hellmuth von Mücke: Ayesha Verlag August Scherl, Berlin 1915 (digitized. [1] )
- Erich Gröner: The German warships 1815–1945, Volume VIII / 2, J. F. Lehmann Verlag, Munich 1968, S.541..
- Hans H. Hildebrand, Albert Röhr, Hans-Otto Steinmetz: The German warships Mundus Publishing, Ratingen undated..
- Ships-human destiny. Saver Ayesha, Issue # 97.
- Olaf Fritsche: Desert sailors Cecilie Dressler Verlag, Hamburg of 2008.
