= Alma Rock Phillips =

Australian actress

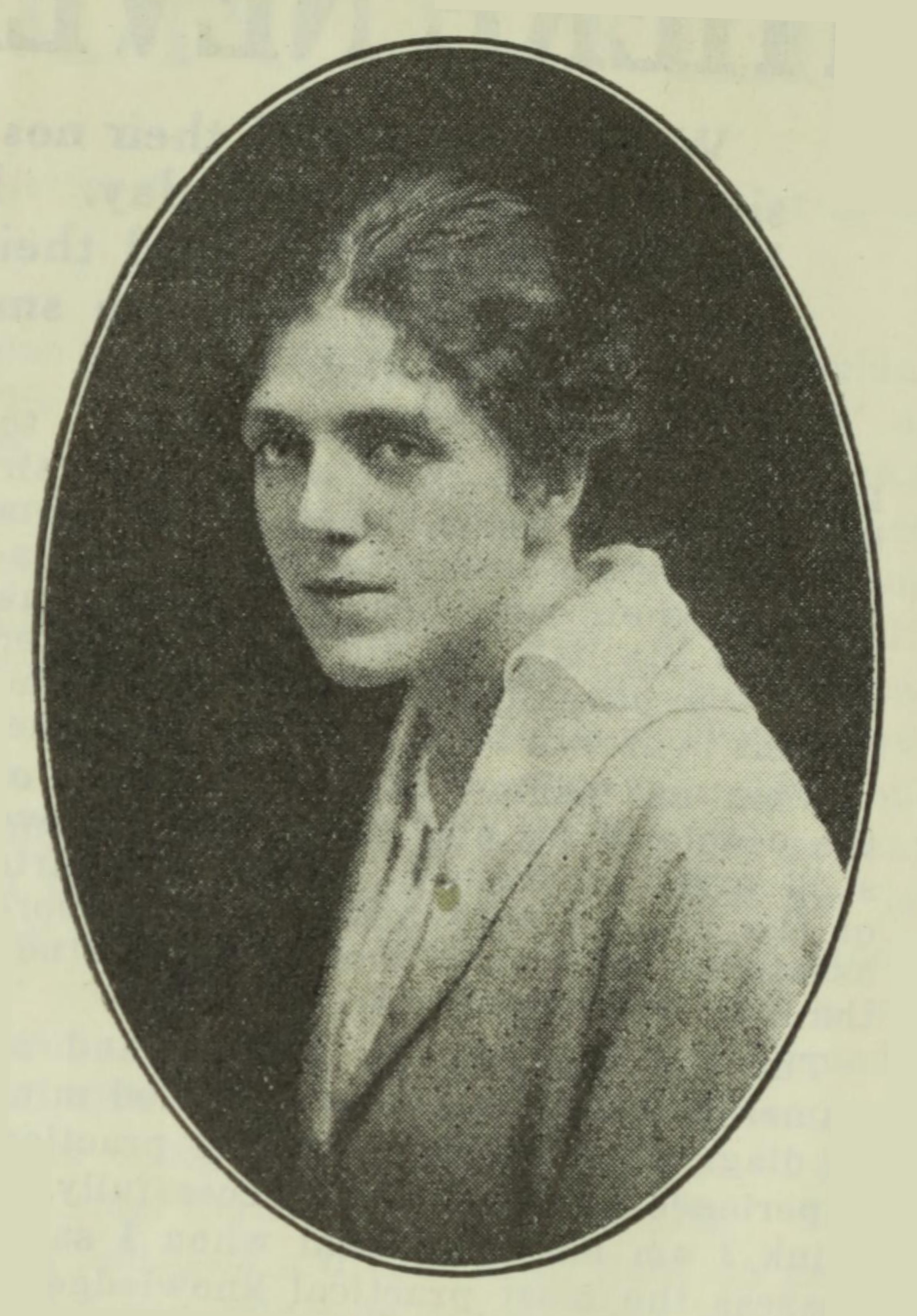
- Portrait of Alma Rock Phillips, published in Lone Hand magazine in January 1916.
- Born: Alma Lillian Mary Phillips; 1890; Balmain, Sydney, New South Wales.
- Died: 20 December 1966 (aged 76); St. Leonards, Sydney, New South Wales.
- Occupation(s): Film and stage actress
- Spouse: Walter Stewart Knox.

Alma Rock Phillips (1890 - 20 December 1966) was an Australian actress of stage and screen. She appeared in a number of early Australian silent films. She was the daughter of Rock Phillips.

== Select film credits ==
- For Australia (1915)
- In the Last Stride (1916)
- The Pioneers (1916)
- The Monk and the Woman (1917)
- A Rough Passage (1922)

== Select theatre credits ==
- Turn to the Right (1918)
- The Rose of Killarney
