= Our Emden =

1926 film

- Austrian release poster
- Directed by: Louis Ralph
- Starring: Louis Ralph; Fritz Greiner; John Mylong
- Cinematography: Werner Bohne; Ewald Daub; Artur von Schwertführer; Josef Wirsching
- Music by: Hans May
- Production company: Münchner Lichtspielkunst
- Distributed by: Bavaria Film
- Release date: 22 December 1926
- Country: Germany
- Languages: Silent; German intertitles

Our Emden (German: Unsere Emden) is a 1926 German silent war film directed by Louis Ralph. It depicts the operations of the German First World War cruiser SMS Emden. In 1932, Ralph remade the story as a sound film Cruiser Emden.

It was made at the Emelka Studios in Munich. The film's sets were designed by the art directors Botho Hoefer and Ludwig Reiber.

== Cast ==
- Louis Ralph
- Fritz Greiner
- John Mylong
- Charles Willy Kayser
- Maria Mindzenty

== See also ==
- How We Fought the Emden (1915)
- The Exploits of the Emden (1928)
- Cruiser Emden (1932)
- Die Männer der Emden (2012)

== Bibliography ==
- Daniel Reynaud. Celluloid Anzacs: The Great War Through Australian Cinema. 2007.
