= Cruiser Emden =

1932 film

- Directed by: Louis Ralph
- Written by: Alfred Halm; Louis Ralph
- Starring: Louis Ralph; Renée Stobrawa; Hans Schlenck; Werner Fuetterer
- Cinematography: Franz Koch; Josef Wirsching
- Music by: Friedrich Jung
- Production company: Bavaria Film
- Distributed by: Bayerische Film
- Release date: 20 May 1932
- Running time: 85 minutes
- Country: Germany
- Language: German

Cruiser Emden (German: Kreuzer Emden) is a 1932 German war film directed by Louis Ralph and starring Ralph, Renée Stobrawa, Hans Schlenck, and Werner Fuetterer. It was shot at the Emelka Studios in Munich. It is a remake of a 1926 silent film Our Emden which had also been directed by Ralph. The film is set on the German First World War cruiser SMS Emden.

== Cast ==
- Louis Ralph as Captain von Müller
- Renée Stobrawa as Grete
- Hans Schlenck as Adjutant
- Werner Fuetterer as Petzold
- Fritz Greiner as Mertens
- Will Dohm as Russian Captain
- Willy Kaiser-Heyl as Australian Captain
- O.E. Hasse as English Officer
- Julius Brandt as English Officer
- Georg Henrich as Direktor Schröder
- Kurd E. Heyne as Matrose der "Emden"
- Toni Forster-Larrinaga as Anuschka
- Rudolf Hoch as Captain of the 'Markomania'
- Charles Willy Kayser as Offizier der "Emden"
- Helmut Käutner as Matrose der 'Emden'
- Else Kündinger as Stenotypist
- Albert Lippert as Offizier der "Emden"
- John Mylong as Offizier der "Emden"
- Reinhold Nietschmann as Volontär Ender
- Walter Pittschau as Offizier der "Emden"
- Helmuth Renar as Offizier der "Emden"
- Julius Riedmueller as Offizier der "Emden"
- Norbert Schultze as Matrose der 'Emden'
- Bobby Todd as Matrose der 'Emden'
- Hans von Strobl as Navigation Officer

== See also ==
- How We Beat the Emden (1915)
- Our Emden (1926)
- The Exploits of the Emden (1928)
- Die Männer der Emden (2012)

== Bibliography ==
- Kelly, Andrew. Cinema and the Great War. Routledge, 1997.
- Kester, Bernadette. Film Front Weimar: Representations of the First World War in German films of the Weimar Period (1919–1933). Amsterdam University Press, 2003.
