= Under the Palms =

Unter den Palmen
- Directed by: Miriam Kruishoop
- Production companies: Argus Film Produktie; X-Filme Creative Pool
- Release date: 1999
- Running time: 82 minutes
- Countries: Netherlands; Germany
- Language: Dutch

Under the Palms or Unter den Palmen is a 1999 Dutch drama film directed by Miriam Kruishoop.

== Cast ==
- Helmut Berger ... David
- Sheri Hagen ... Tanya
- Udo Kier ... Ludwig
- Thom Hoffman ... Thomas
- Willem Nijholt ... Willem
