= The Monk and the Woman =

- Directed by: Franklyn Barrett
- Written by: Franklyn Barrett; D.H. Souter (titles)
- Based on: play by Frederick Melville
- Produced by: Franklyn Barrett; George Marlow; Harry Musgrove
- Cinematography: Franklyn Barrett
- Production company: Australian Famous Players
- Release date: 8 October 1917
- Running time: 6,000 feet
- Country: Australia
- Languages: Silent film; English intertitles
- Budget: £1,000

The Monk and the Woman is a 1917 Australian silent film directed by Franklyn Barrett. It is considered to be lost.

It was famous for its "sensation and commotion."

A 1926 article said it was one of the most highly regarded early Australian films.

== Plot ==
In eighteenth century France, the evil Prince de Montrale (Harry Plimmer) falls in love with Liane (Maud Fane), but she runs away from him and seeks refuge in a monastery. The prince finds her and orders the abbot to keep her in custody. A young novice, Brother Paul (Percy Marmont), is placed in charge of Liane and falls in love with her, despite having just taken his vows of celibacy.

The king (Monte Luke) commands that Liane marry the Prince. A wedding is prepared but Paul defeats the prince in a duel, steals his cloak and takes his place at the wedding. The impersonation is discovered and Paul is taken away to be executed. De Montrale leads a revolt against the king but Paul keeps fighting off the attack until loyalists arrive. Paul then returns to the monastery forever.

== Cast ==
- Maud Fane as Countess Liane
- Percy Marmont as Brother Paul
- Harry Plimmer as Prince de Montrale
- Monte Luke as The King
- Alma Rock Phillips as de Vernet
- Ruth Wainwright as Madame de Vigne, The King's Favourite
- Hugh Huntley as Armande
- Charles Beetham
- George Young
- Mattie Ive as Page Boy

== Original play ==
The play was first produced in England in 1912 where it ran for a year. Theatre entrepreneur George Marlow bought the Australian rights and presented it in 1912. It was controversial and received protests from church groups, being condemned by the Australian Catholic Federation and called "a most offensive travesty on the Catholic religion".

The film version changed the ending so that Brother Paul renounced his loved one and returned to the monastery, whereas in the play the two lovers stayed together.

== Production ==
Barrett was going to make a film with Dorothy Brunton called The Web but she became unavailable. Instead he was offered The Monk and the Woman. JC Willamsons allowed them to hire costumes for free and to film at the Theatre Royal and use their acting talent.

The film adaptation was likely made in response to the 1917 film The Church and the Woman. Shooting began in August 1917 and took place on the stage of the Theatre Royal in Sydney, and on location in French's Forest, Sydney, with some additional scenes shot at W.D. Dailey's castle in Manly.

Percy Marmont, Hugh Huntley and Maud Fane were all British stage stars then touring Australia; this was Marmont's film debut. It was produced by noted stage actor George Marlow.

Barett says it took 28 days from the first day of filming to presenting it to the censor. Everyone's later claimed "Besides setting Marmont on the road to screen stardom, the picture was the third to be shot under electric light anywhere South of the Dine."

== Release ==
Despite changing the ending, the film was still seen as controversial by the Catholic Federation, who objected to its depiction of Catholicism. However, it was still passed by the censor. Advertisements heavily played up the controversy and the movie was a major success at the box office. It was still screening in cinemas in 1922.

=== Critical ===
In the words of the Sunday Times "costume plays are notoriously at once difficult and expensive of production, and the utmost care must be exercised in order to escape anachronism. In this direction the pitfalls seem to have been avoided in the skilled hands o£ Mr W. Franklyn Barrett, who adapted the play to photography and produced; of Mr. D. H. Souter, who is responsible for the artistic titles; and of Mr. Rock Phillips, who undertook the art production."

=== Legal issues ===
George Marlow sued the makers of The Church and the Woman (1917) and got a court injunction forcing the producers of the latter to advertise their film specifically saying it was different from The Monk and the Woman. This was done.

== See also ==
- List of lost films
