= Humbert Pugliese =

Humbert Pugliese (1884–1955) was an Australian film exhibitor and producer. A chain of cinemas had been established by his father Antonio and wife Caroline and Humbert became general manager when his father died in 1916. His chain was often supportive of Australian films and Humbert produced three features.

== Life ==
Pugliese was born in 1884 and he was registered with the name of Umberto. His mother was Caroline Frances Pugliese (born Donaldson) and she was the second wife of his father Antonio Pugliese who was an Italian immigrant labourer.

Pugliese became involved in family's theatrical enterprises in 1906 when his parents took control of Sydney's Alhambra Theatre. During the next 15 years he helped oversee the production of a wide array of entertainments at the theatre, including waxworks exhibits, vaudeville shows, revues, dramas, musical comedies, pantomimes and films. The 1910s also saw Pugliese and his mother produce three early Australian films, while also managing the operations of at cinemas in Bondi and Leichhardt. He later became the proprietor of the shoe store chain Mabs McGuirk.

== Film credits ==
- The Church and the Woman (1917) - producer
- The Waybacks (1918) - producer
- Struck Oil (1919) - producer
