= Pugliese =

Pugliese, meaning of, from or relating to Apulia (Italian Puglia), may refer to:

- Pugliese (surname)
- Salentino dialect (Italian Pugliese)

== Agriculture ==
- The Apulo-Calabrese breed of pig, also known as the Pugliese

== Cuisine ==
- Pizza pugliese
- Apulian or pugliese bread

== Military ==
- Pugliese torpedo defense system, named after Umberto Pugliese
