= German ship Emden =

Emden may refer to one of the following German naval ships that were named after the town of Emden on the Ems River:

- SMS Emden (1908), a Dresden-class light cruiser of the Kaiserliche Marine commissioned in 1909. She sank two Allied warships and sank or captured nearly thirty Allied merchant vessels during World War I, and was run aground after the Battle of Cocos in 1914.
- SMS Emden (1916), a Königsberg-class cruiser of the Kaiserliche Marine that was scuttled at Scapa Flow in 1919
- Emden, a unique light cruiser of the Reichsmarine (later Kriegsmarine) commissioned in 1925 and scrapped in 1949.
- Emden, a Köln-class frigate of the Bundesmarine commissioned in 1961 and withdrawn in 1983.
- Emden, a Bremen-class frigate of the Bundesmarine commissioned in 1983 and withdrawn in 2013.
- Emden, a Braunschweig-class corvette of the Bundesmarine that entered service in 2023.
