= Friedrich Jung =

Austrian composer

Friedrich Jung (17 June 1897, in Vienna – 16 March 1975, in Dornbirn) was an Austrian composer.

His symphony in B-flat major was a musical history of Adolf Hitler's rise to power, with movements titled "Germany 1918", "heroes' memorial", "parliamentary death dance", and "Germany 1933".

== Selected filmography ==
- Cruiser Emden (1932)
- Fürst Seppl (1932)
- Die Zwei vom Südexpress (1932)
- Der sündige Hof (1933)

== Bibliography ==
- Spotts, Frederic. Bayreuth: A History of the Wagner Festival. Yale University Press, 1996.
