= Sheri Hagen =

German actress

Sheri Hagen (born 1968 in Lagos) is a German actor, writer, director, and film producer based in Berlin, owner of the production company Equity Film GmbH, and promoter and advocate for diversity within German film.

== Life ==
Sheri Hagen was born in Lagos, grew up in Hamburg, and has lived in Berlin since the mid-1990s. Her first language is German. Originally she wanted to become a doctor, but when she accompanied a friend to an audition for a musical project, both were accepted. Hagen received her acting training at the Theater an der Wien. From 2010 to 2012 she acted at the Berlin Vaganten Bühne and acted in the 2013/14 season at the Ballhaus Naunynstraße.

Hagen mostly works in front of the camera. Since 1995, after her television debut in an episode of the series Praxis Bülowbogen, she has been seen in numerous productions, such as multiple episodes of Tatort, as well as in other series such as Der Landarzt, Siska, and Bella Block. She also acted in films like Baal, based on the play of the same name by Bertolt Brecht, The Lives of Others, and as the US Secretary of State Condoleezza Rice in the ZDF-two-part series Deutschlandspiel.

Alongside her acting work, Hagen created her own projects, working as the writer, director, and producer, such as the 2012 award-winning film Auf den zweiten Blick in which Michael Klammer, Pierre Sanoussi-Bliss, and Ingo Naujoks acted. In this film, which focuses on diversity, Hagen not only fights for racial diversity in film, but also showcases disability within film. In 2018 her film Fenster Blau, an adaptation of the play Muttermale Fenster Blau by Marianna Salzmann was released into theaters. Hagen has her own film production company, Equality Film GmbH, which is based in Berlin. In addition to using her films as works of activism, Hagen also promotes diversity in film and television as an expert in her field.

== Selected filmography ==
- 1995: Praxis Bülowbogen: Alles brave Bürger hier (TV series episode)
- 1995: Der Clan der Anna Voss
- 1996: Tatort: Lockvögel (TV series episode)
- 1996: Auf Achse: Nichts als Ärger mit dem Kind (TV series episode)
- 1996: Faust: Auf Sendung (TV series episode)
- 1996: Der Landarzt: Ansteckungsgefahr (TV series episode)
- 1996: The Old Fox: Der Lebensretter (TV series episode)
- 1997: Verdammtes Glück
- 1997–1998: Leinen los für MS Königstein (TV series, 3 episodes as Tina)
- 1998: Single sucht Nachwuchs
- 1998: Einsatz Hamburg Süd: Schutz (TV series episode)
- 1999: Drei mit Herz
- 1999: Under the Palms
- 1999: Siska: Der Schlüssel zum Mord (TV series episode)
- 2000: Golden Boy
- 2000: Liebesengel
- 2000: Harte Jungs und weiche Windeln
- 2000: Deutschlandspiel
- 2002: Ein Albtraum von 3½ Kilo
- 2004: Baal
- 2004: Siska: Morgen bist du tot (TV series episode)
- 2005: Wo bleibst du, Baby?
- 2005: Koala in the Kitchen
- 2005: Tatort: Minenspiel (TV series episode)
- 2005: Tatort: Leiden wie ein Tier (TV series episode)
- 2006: The Lives of Others
- 2006: Tatort: Tod aus Afrika (TV series episode)
- 2006: Beim nächsten Kind wird alles anders
- 2007: Sperling und die kalte Angst (TV series episode)
- 2007: R. I. S. – Die Sprache der Toten: Traumatisiert (TV series episode)
- 2009: Volcano
- 2009: Tatort: Das Gespenst (TV series episode)
- 2011: On the Inside
- 2012: Auf den zweiten Blick (producer)
- 2012: Die Männer der Emden
- 2012: Flemming: Der Sinn des Lebens (TV series episode)
- 2013: Bella Block: Angeklagt (TV series episode)
- 2014: Die Schlikkerfrauen
- 2015: Der Äthiopier
- 2016: Der Alte: Paradiesvogel (TV series episode)
- 2017: SOKO Leipzig: Melodie des Todes (TV series episode)
- 2017: Die Luther Matrix
- 2017: SOKO Stuttgart: Melodie des Todes (TV series episode)
- 2019: Herr und Frau Bulle: Totentanz (TV series episode)
- 2021: Biohackers
- 2021: Der Zürich-Krimi: Borchert und der Mord im Taxi (TV series episode)
- 2021: Nie zu spät

== Personal projects ==
- 2007: Stella und die Störche (short film, credited as writer, director, producer and actor)
- 2013: Auf den zweiten Blick (theatrical release, credited as writer, director and producer)
- 2015: Simply Different (short film, credited as writer, director, producer and actor)
- 2017: Fenster Blau (theatrical release, credited as writer, director and producer)

== Awards ==
- 2012: Schreibtisch am Meer for Auf den zweiten Blick
- 2013: Prize winner at the Kirchlichen Filmfestival Recklinghausen for Auf den zweiten Blick
