= Van Emden =

van Emden is a surname. Notable people with the surname include:

- Anicka van Emden (born 1986), Dutch judoka
- Helmut Fritz van Emden (born 1933), German-born British entomologist
- Jos van Emden (born 1985), Dutch cyclist
- Maarten van Emden (1937–2023), Dutch-Canadian mathematician and computer scientist
- Richard van Emden (born 1965), English writer
