= The Exploits of the Emden =

1928 film

- Directed by: Ken G. Hall; Louis Ralph
- Written by: Ken G. Hall
- Produced by: Ken G. Hall
- Starring: Officers and men of the Royal Australian Navy
- Cinematography: Ray Vaughan; Claude Carter
- Edited by: Ken G. Hall
- Production company: First National Pictures (Australia)
- Distributed by: First National
- Release date: 21 September 1928
- Running time: 10,000 feet
- Countries: Australia; Weimar Republic

The Exploits of the Emden is a 1928 silent Australian film about the Battle of Cocos; the World War I naval battle between Australian cruiser HMAS Sydney and German cruiser SMS Emden. It consists of footage from a 1926 German film, Our Emden, with additional sequences shot in Australia by director Ken G. Hall. Only part of the film survives today.

== Plot ==
Prior to World War I, a German officer in China sends for his wife to join him. When war is declared, he is assigned to the Emden. He is reunited with his wife when the Emden takes aboard passengers from the Diplomat in the Indian Ocean. The Emden fights the Sydney and is destroyed but the German officer survives.

== Development ==
The Australian rights to Our Emden were bought by First National Pictures, but when the film arrived in 1927 they were worried about the casting of Germans to play Australians. John Jones, the managing director of First National, assigned his publicity director, Ken G. Hall with the task of shooting additional scenes. At this stage of Hall's career, his only experience in handling film came with re-editing movies to meet the requirements of Australian censorship.

== Additional scenes ==
Hall wrote and shot a number of new sequences, including one where an Australian soldier on the Emden collects his debts before the battle begins. The movie was made with the co-operation of the Royal Australian Navy, who allowed Hall to shoot footage on the real HMAS Sydney while it was training off Jervis Bay. Technical advice was provided by a signaller from the battle.

Hall later said in a 1972 interview that the more research he did into the battle, the less impressed he was with how Sydney's captain, John Glossop had acted:

Only when I came to make the picture did I realise that she should have bloody well sunk the Emden and she should have sunk her without one single Sydney man being injured. She had no right to bombard a wreck up on a reef, with no chance of retaliation just because the surviving Germans had not lowered their flag, so they poured another five salvoes in and killed 50 men... Captain Glossop, R.N., let it be noted, should never have brought the Sydney within range because she out-gunned, out-ranged and out-sped the Emden. She had only to stay away and blow the German ship out of the water, that's all. But he got 11 killed through making this mistake, so they sent him back to England after his 'great' victory.

== Reception ==
The film enjoyed good reviews and was a popular success at the box office, launching Hall's directorial career.

== See also ==
- How We Fought the Emden, a 1915 film by Alfred Rolfe, also about the Battle of Cocos
- Our Emden (1926)
- Cruiser Emden (1932)
- Die Männer der Emden (2012)
