= Boyd Irwin =

English actor (1880–1957)

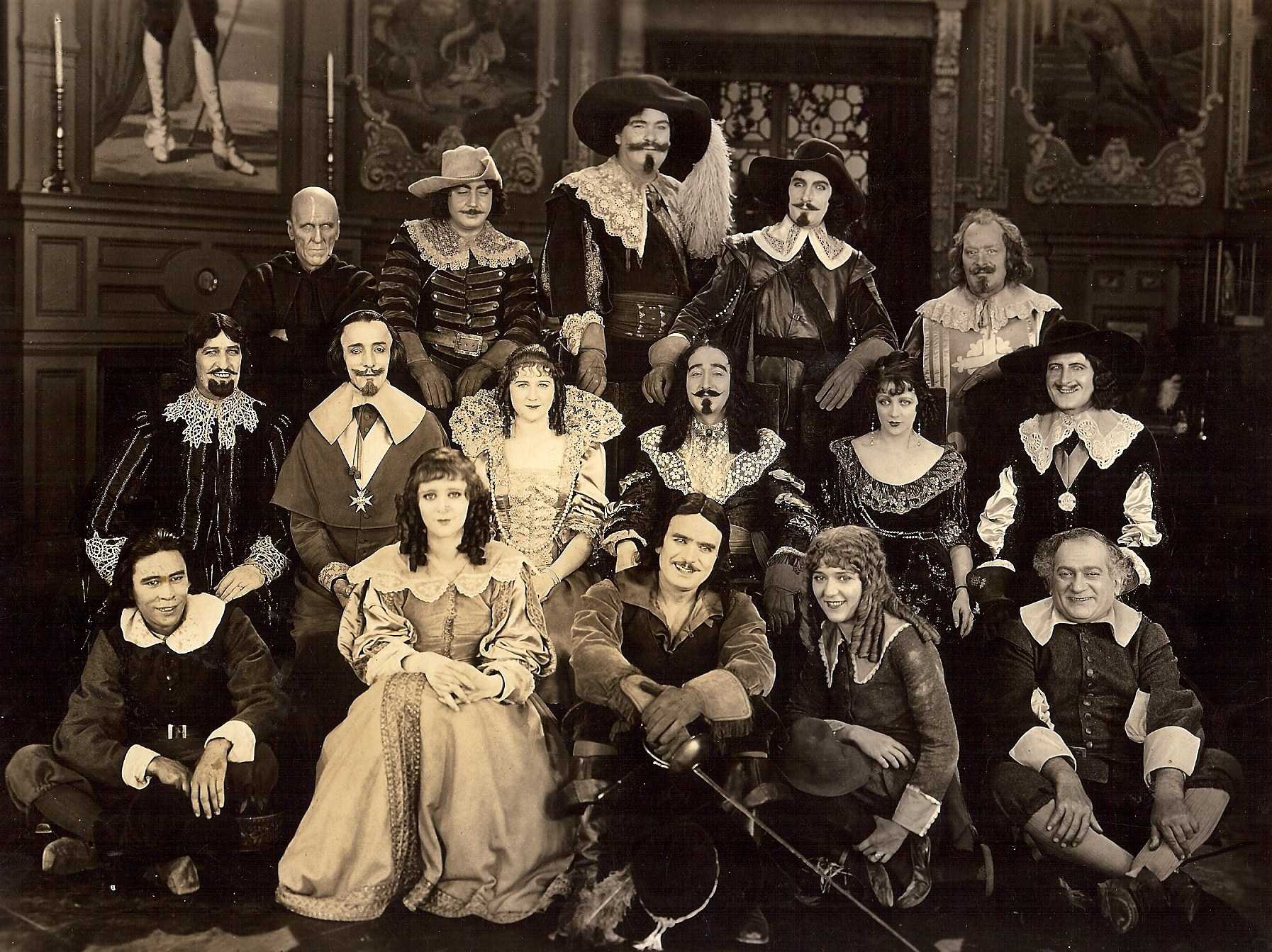
- Cast of The Three Musketeers (1921), Boyd Irwin left in second row
- Born: 12 March 1880; Brighton, Sussex, England
- Died: 22 January 1957 (aged 76); Los Angeles, California, USA
- Occupation: Actor
- Years active: 1915-1948

Boyd Irwin (12 March 1880 – 22 January 1957) was an English stage and film actor. He appeared in more than 130 films between 1915 and 1948, both silent and "talkies", including a starring role in Australian film For Australia in 1915. He was born in Brighton, Sussex and died in Los Angeles, California.

== Selected filmography ==
- The Luck of Geraldine Laird (1920)
- Milestones (1920)
- Eyes of the Eagle (1920)
- A Lady in Love (1920)
- A Gilded Dream (1920)
- The Fatal Sign (1920)
- The Three Musketeers (1921)
- The Long Chance (1922)
- Around the World in Eighteen Days (1923)
- Ashes of Vengeance (1923)
- Enemies of Children (1923)
- Captain Blood (1924)
- Madam Satan (1930) - as the skipper of a dirigible
- The Common Law (1931)
- Dr. Jekyll and Mr. Hyde (1931) - as the head of Scotland Yard
- Cardinal Richelieu (1935)
- The Widow from Monte Carlo (1935)
- Accent on Youth (1935)
- Devil's Squadron (1936) - as head of the airport
- Give Me Liberty (1936)
- Killer at Large (1936)
- The Man in the Iron Mask (1939)
- The Witness Vanishes (1939)
- The Invisible Killer (1939)
- Sky Patrol (1939)
- Drums of the Desert (1940)
- Passage from Hong Kong (1941)
- The Great Swindle (1941)
- Foreign Agent (1942)
- The Major and the Minor (1942)
- King of the Bandits (1947)
- Monsieur Verdoux (1947)
- Docks of New Orleans (1948)
