= Monte Luke =

Australian photographer, actor and director

Monte Luke (1885–1962), born Charles Robert Montague Luke, was an Australian photographer, actor and director.

== Biography ==
Born in Geelong he worked as an actor on stage before developing an interest in stills photography. He was appointed official photographer for J. C. Williamson, taking portraits of stage stars and publicity shots of plays in production. In 1915 he was placed in charge of film production for J. C. Williamson Ltd after Fred Niblo left the country, and directed three features for them. He then set up a photography studio and became one of the leading photographers in the country.

He was photographer for the respected Sydney magazine The Bystander.

== Select filmography ==
- For Australia (1915) - director
- Within the Law (1916) - director
- Seven Keys to Baldpate (1916) - director
- The Monk and the Woman (1917) - actor
