= Edwin Palmer Hoyt =

American writer (1923–2005)

Edwin Palmer Hoyt Jr.
- Born: August 5, 1923; Portland, Oregon, U.S.
- Died: July 29, 2005 (aged 81); Tokyo, Japan
- Occupation: Historian
- Writing career
- Subject: Military history

Edwin Palmer Hoyt Jr. (August 5, 1923 – July 29, 2005) was an American writer and historian who specialized in military history. Until 1958, Hoyt worked in news media, after which he produced non-fiction works.

== Early life ==
He was born in Portland, Oregon to the publisher Edwin Palmer Hoyt (1897–1979) and his wife, the former Cecile DeVore (1901–1970). A younger brother, Charles Richard, was born in 1928. Hoyt attended the University of Oregon from 1940 to 1943.

== Career ==
In 1943, Hoyt's father, then the editor and publisher of The Oregonian, was appointed by President Franklin Roosevelt as the director of the Domestic Branch, Office of War Information. The younger Hoyt served with the Office of War Information during World War II, from 1943 to 1945. In 1945 and 1946, he served as a foreign correspondent for The Denver Post (of which his father became editor and publisher in 1946) and the United Press, reporting from locations in China, Thailand, Burma, India, the Middle East, Europe, North Africa, and Korea.

Edwin Hoyt subsequently worked as an ABC broadcaster, covering the 1948 revolution in Czechoslovakia and the Arab-Israeli conflict. From 1949 to 1951, he was the editor of the editorial page at The Denver Post. He was the editor and publisher of the Colorado Springs Free Press from 1951 to 1955, and an associate editor of Collier's Weekly in New York from 1955 to 1956. In 1957 he was a television producer and writer-director at CBS, and in 1958 he was an assistant publisher of American Heritage magazine in New York.

Starting in 1958, Hoyt became a full-time writer, and for a few years (1976 to 1980) he served as a part-time lecturer at the University of Hawaii. In the 40 years since his first publication in 1960, he produced nearly 200 published works. While Hoyt wrote about 20 novels (many published under the pseudonyms Christopher Martin and Cabot L. Forbes), the vast majority of his works are biographies and other forms of non-fiction, with a heavy emphasis on World War II military history.

Hoyt died in Tokyo, Japan on July 29, 2005, after a prolonged illness. He was survived by his wife Hiroko, of Tokyo, and three children, Diana, Helga, and Christopher, all residing in the U.S.

== Selected works ==
- Jumbos and Jackasses: A Popular History of Political Wars. New York: Doubleday (1960) OCLC 1313217
- One Penny Black: The Story of Stamp Collecting. Duell, Sloan & Pearce (1965)
- The House of Morgan. Dodd, Mead & Company (Library of Congress Catalog Card No. 66-24266) (1966) OCLC 740453
- The Last Cruise of the Emden: The Amazing True WWI Story of a German-Light Cruiser and Her Courageous Crew. London: Andre Deutsch (1967) OCLC 1394730
  - 2001: Lyons Press, ISBN 1585743828
- The Army Without A Country. Macmillan: New York (1967) OCLC 843778
- The American Attitude: The Story of the Making of Foreign Policy in the United States. Abelard (1970) ISBN 0200716948 OCLC 128452
- Leyte Gulf: The Death of the Princeton. Lancer Books (1972) OCLC 329290
- Raider Wolf: The Voyage of Captain Nerger, 1916 - 1918. NY: Paul S. Eriksson, Inc. (1974) ISBN 0839770677 OCLC 1128815
- Blue Skies and Blood: The Battle of the Coral Sea. VT: Eriksson (1975) ISBN 0839710216 OCLC 1573089
- Alan Watts: The Rise and Decline of the Ordained Shaman of the Counterculture, (under pseudonym David Stuart) Chilton Book Co, PA (1976)
- U-Boats Offshore: When Hitler Struck America. NY: Stein & Day (1978) ISBN 0812825055 OCLC 3845550
- McCampbell's Heroes: The Navy's Most Celebrated Carrier Fighters of the Pacific War, reprint, NY: Avon.
- Storm over the Gilberts: War in the Central Pacific: 1943, NY: Van Nostrand Reinhold, 1978, reprint, NY: Avon, 1983, ISBN 0-380-63651-4 .
- To the Marianas: War in the Central Pacific: 1944, reprint, NY: Avon.
- Closing the Circle: War in the Central Pacific: 1945, reprint, NY: Avon.
- USS Constitution: The Exciting Story of Old Ironsides, Pinnacle Books INC, NY (1976) ISBN 0-523-00866-X
- The Men of the Gambier Bay, VT: Paul S. Eriksson, Inc. (1979) ISBN 0839757905
- Guerilla: Colonel von Lettow-Vorbeck and Germany's East African Empire. Macmillan (1981)
- The Pusan Perimeter. NY: Stein and Day (1984) ISBN 0812829603 OCLC 10483199
- On To The Yalu. NY: Stein and Day (1984) ISBN 0-8128-2977-8
- The Militarists: The Rise of Japanese Militarism Since WW II. New York: D.I. Fine (1985) ISBN 0917657179
- Japan's War: The Great Pacific Conflict, 1853 to 1952. NY: McGraw (1986) ISBN 0070306125 OCLC 12722494
- Hitler's War (1988) ISBN 0-07-030622-2
- The GI's War: The Story of American Soldiers in Europe in WW II. McGraw-Hill (May 1988) ISBN 0070306273 OCLC 17107693
- The Rise of the Chinese Republic. McGraw-Hill (1989) ISBN 0-07-030619-2
- Hirohito: The Emperor and the Man. NY: Praeger (1992) ISBN 978-0-275-94069-0; OCLC 23766658
- 199 Days: The Battle for Stalingrad. Tor Books. (1993) ISBN 978-0-312-85463-8
- Angels of Death: Goering's Luftwaffe. NY: Forge (1994) ISBN 0312856687
- Mussolini's Empire: The Rise and Fall of the Fascist Vision. NY: John Wiley & Sons (1994) ISBN 0471591513
- Inferno: The Firebombing of Japan, March 9 – August 15, 1945. Madison Books (2000) ISBN 978-1-56833-149-2
- The Last Kamikaze: The Story of Admiral Matome Ugaki. NY: Praeger (2008) ISBN 978-0-313-36065-7
