= SMS Emden =

Light cruiser of the German Imperial Navy

Coordinates: 11.8333°S 96.8167°E

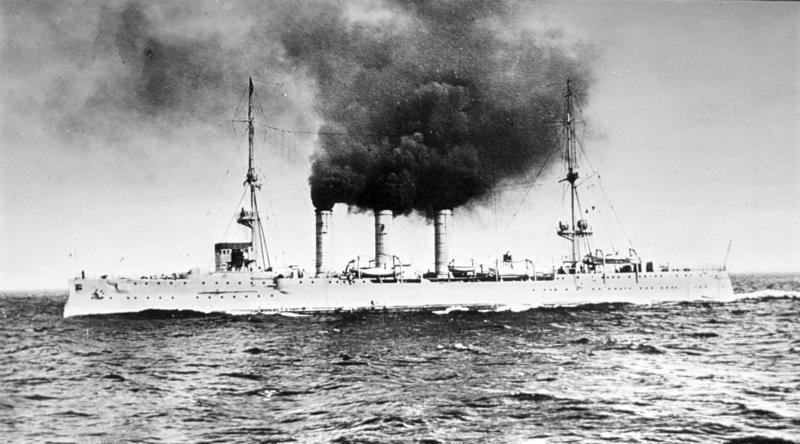
- Emden underway in 1910

History

German Empire
- Name: Emden
- Namesake: City of Emden
- Builder: Kaiserliche Werft, Danzig
- Laid down: 1 November 1906
- Launched: 26 May 1908
- Commissioned: 10 July 1909
- Fate: Disabled by HMAS Sydney and grounded off the Cocos Islands, 9 November 1914

General characteristics
- Class & type: Dresden-class cruiser
- Displacement: Normal: 3,664 t (3,606 long tons); Full load: 4,268 t (4,201 long tons)
- Length: 118.3 m (388 ft 1 in)
- Beam: 13.5 m (44 ft 3 in)
- Draft: 5.53 m (18 ft 2 in)
- Installed power: 13,315 ihp (9,929 kW); 12 water-tube boilers
- Propulsion: 2 × triple-expansion steam engines; 2 × screw propellers
- Speed: 23.5 kn (43.5 km/h; 27.0 mph)
- Range: 3,760 nmi (6,960 km; 4,330 mi) at 12 knots (22 km/h; 14 mph)
- Complement: 18 officers; 343 enlisted men
- Armament: 10 × 10.5 cm (4.1 in) SK L/40 guns; 8 × 5.2 cm (2 in) SK L/55 SK L/55 guns; 2 × 45 cm (17.7 in) torpedo tubes
- Armor: Deck: 80 mm (3.1 in); Conning tower: 100 mm (3.9 in); Gun shields: 50 mm (2 in)

SMS Emden ("His Majesty's Ship Emden") (Note: "SMS" stands for "Seiner Majestät Schiff" (German: His Majesty's Ship).) was the second and final member of the Dresden class of light cruisers built for the German Kaiserliche Marine (Imperial Navy). Named for the town of Emden, she was laid down at the Kaiserliche Werft (Imperial Dockyard) in Danzig in 1906. The hull was launched in May 1908, and completed in July 1909. She had one sister ship, Dresden. Like the preceding Königsberg-class cruisers, Emden was armed with ten 10.5 cm (4.1 in) guns and two torpedo tubes.

Emden spent the majority of her career overseas in the East Asia Squadron, based in Qingdao, in the Jiaozhou Bay Leased Territory in China. In 1913, Karl von Müller took command of the ship. At the outbreak of World War I, Emden captured a Russian steamer and converted her into the commerce raider Cormoran. Emden rejoined the East Asia Squadron, then was detached for independent raiding in the Indian Ocean. The cruiser spent nearly two months operating in the region, and captured nearly two dozen ships. On 28 October 1914, Emden launched a surprise attack on Penang; in the resulting Battle of Penang, she sank the Russian cruiser Zhemchug and the French destroyer Mousquet.

Müller then took Emden to raid the Cocos Islands, where he landed a contingent of sailors to destroy British facilities. There, Emden was attacked by the Australian cruiser HMAS Sydney on 9 November 1914. The more powerful Australian ship quickly inflicted serious damage and forced Müller to run his ship aground to avoid sinking. Out of a crew of 376, 133 were killed in the battle. Most of the survivors were taken prisoner; the landing party, led by Hellmuth von Mücke, commandeered an old schooner and eventually returned to Germany. Emden's wreck was quickly destroyed by wave action, and was broken up for scrap in the 1950s.

== Design ==
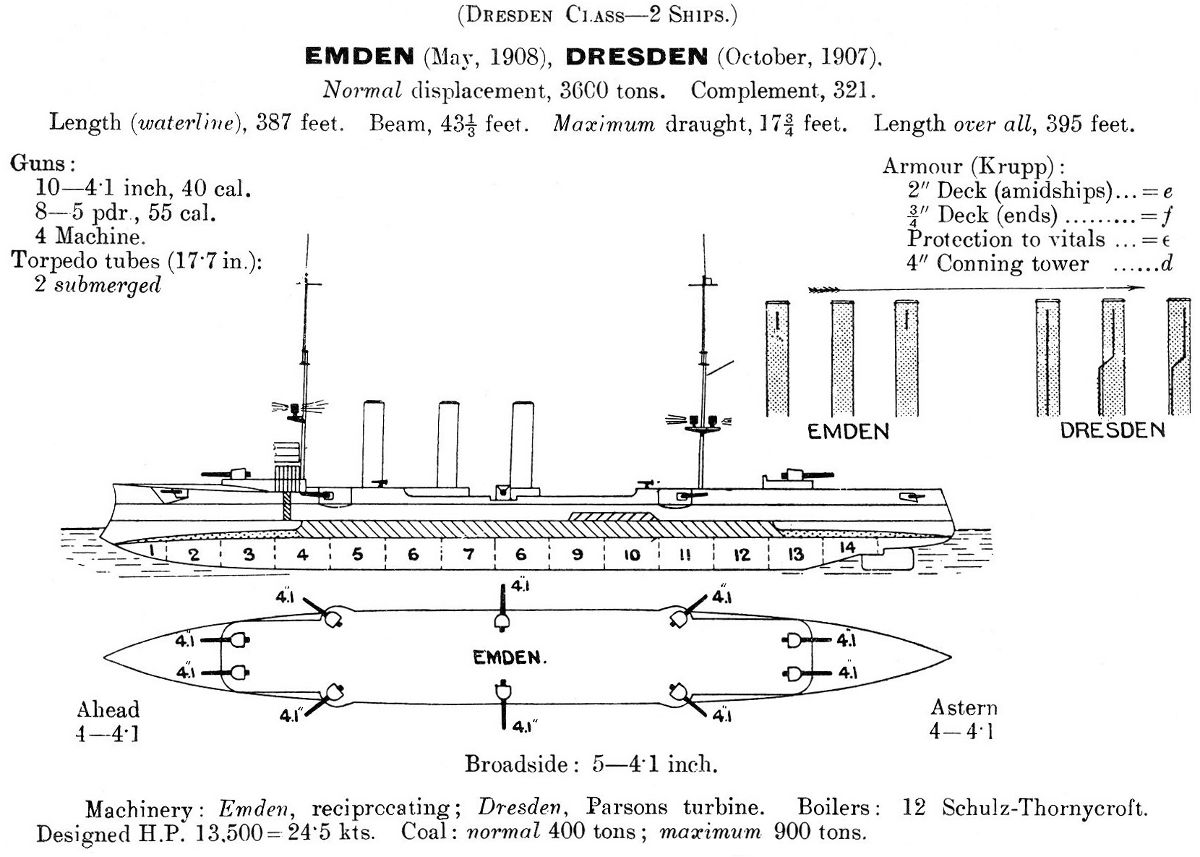
Line-drawing of the Dresden class

The 1898 Naval Law authorized the construction of thirty new light cruisers; the program began with the Gazelle class, which was developed into the Bremen and Königsberg classes, both of which incorporated incremental improvements over the course of construction. The primary alteration for the two Dresden-class cruisers, assigned to the 1906 fiscal year, consisted of an additional boiler for the propulsion system to increase engine power.

Emden was 118.3 meters (388 ft 1 in) long overall and had a beam of 13.5 m (44 ft 3 in) and a draft of 5.53 m (18 ft 2 in) forward. She displaced 3,664 metric tons (3,606 long tons) as designed and up to 4,268 t (4,201 long tons) at full load. The ship had a minimal superstructure, which consisted of a small conning tower and bridge structure. Her hull had a raised forecastle and quarterdeck, along with a pronounced ram bow. She was fitted with two pole masts. She had a crew of 18 officers and 343 enlisted men.

Her propulsion system consisted of two triple-expansion steam engines drove a pair of screw propellers. Steam was provided by twelve coal-fired Marine-type water-tube boilers that were vented through three funnels. The propulsion system was designed to give 13,500 metric horsepower (9,900 kW) for a top speed of 23.5 knots (43.5 km/h; 27.0 mph). Emden carried up to 860 metric tons (850 long tons) of coal, which gave a range of 3,760 nautical miles (6,960 km; 4,330 mi) at 12 knots (22 km/h; 14 mph). Emden was the last German cruiser to be equipped with triple-expansion engines; all subsequent cruisers used the more powerful steam turbines.

The ship's main battery comprised ten 10.5 cm (4.1 in) SK L/40 guns in single pivot mounts. Two were placed side by side forward on the forecastle; six were located on the broadside, three on either side; and two were placed side by side aft. The guns could engage targets out to 12,200 m (40,000 ft), and were supplied with 1,500 rounds of ammunition, 150 per gun. The secondary armament consisted of eight 5.2 cm (2 in) SK L/55 guns, also in single mounts. She had two 45 cm (17.7 in) torpedo tubes with four torpedoes, mounted below the waterline, and could carry fifty naval mines.

The ship was protected by a curved armored deck that was up to 80 mm (3.1 in) thick. It sloped downward at the sides of the hull to provide defense against incoming fire; the sloped portion was 50 mm (2 in) thick. The conning tower had 100 mm (3.9 in) thick sides, and the guns were protected by 50 mm (2 in) thick gun shields.

== Service history ==
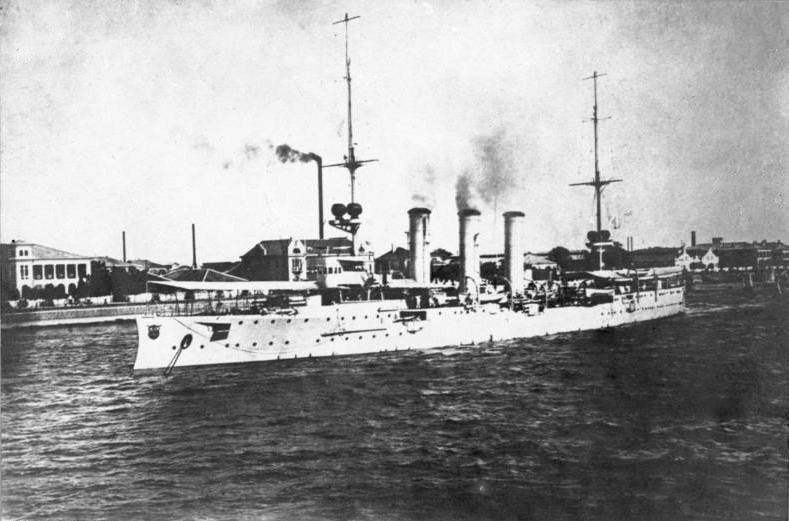
Emden in Qingdao in early 1914

The contract for Emden, ordered as ersatz (replacement) Pfeil, (Note: German warships were ordered under provisional names. Additions to the fleet were given a single letter; ships intended to replace older or lost vessels were ordered as "Ersatz (name of the ship to be replaced)".) was placed on 6 April 1906 at the Kaiserliche Werft (Imperial Dockyard) in Danzig. Her keel was laid down on 1 November 1906. She was launched on 26 May 1908 and christened by the Oberbürgermeister (Lord Mayor) of the city of Emden, Dr. Leo Fürbringer. After fitting-out work was completed by 10 July 1909, she was commissioned into the fleet. The new cruiser began sea trials that day but interrupted them from 11 August to 5 September to participate in the annual autumn maneuvers of the main fleet. During this period, Emden also escorted the imperial yacht Hohenzollern with Kaiser Wilhelm II aboard. Emden was decommissioned in September after completing trials.

On 1 April 1910 Emden was reactivated and assigned to the Ostasiengeschwader (East Asia Squadron), based at Qingdao in Germany's Jiaozhou Bay Leased Territory in China. The concession had been seized in 1897 in retaliation for the murder of German nationals in the area. Emden left Kiel on 12 April 1910, bound for Asia by way of a goodwill tour of South America. A month later, on 12 May, she stopped in Montevideo and met with the cruiser Bremen, which was assigned to the Ostamerikanischen (East American) Station. Emden and Bremen stayed in Buenos Aires from 17 to 30 May to represent Germany at the celebrations of the hundredth anniversary of Argentinian independence. The two ships then rounded Cape Horn; Emden stopped in Valparaíso, Chile, while Bremen continued on to Peru.

The cruise across the Pacific was delayed because of a lack of good quality coal. Emden eventually took on around 1,400 t (1,400 long tons; 1,500 short tons) of coal at the Chilean naval base at Talcahuano and departed on 24 June. The cruise was used to evaluate the ship on long-distance voyages for use in future light cruiser designs. Emden encountered unusually severe weather on the trip, which included a stop at Easter Island. She anchored at Papeete, Tahiti to coal on 12 July, as the bunkers were nearly empty after crossing 4,200 nautical miles (7,800 km; 4,800 mi). The ship then proceeded to Apia in German Samoa, arriving on 22 July. There, she met the rest of the East Asia Squadron, commanded by Konteradmiral (Rear Admiral) Erich Gühler. The squadron remained in Samoa until October, when the ships returned to their base at Qingdao. Emden was sent to the Yangtze River from 27 October to 19 November, which included a visit to Hankou. The ship visited Nagasaki, Japan, before returning to Qingdao on 22 December for an annual refit. The repair work was not carried out; the Sokehs Rebellion erupted on Ponape in the Carolines, which required Emden's presence; she departed Qingdao on 28 December, and Nürnberg left Hong Kong to join her.

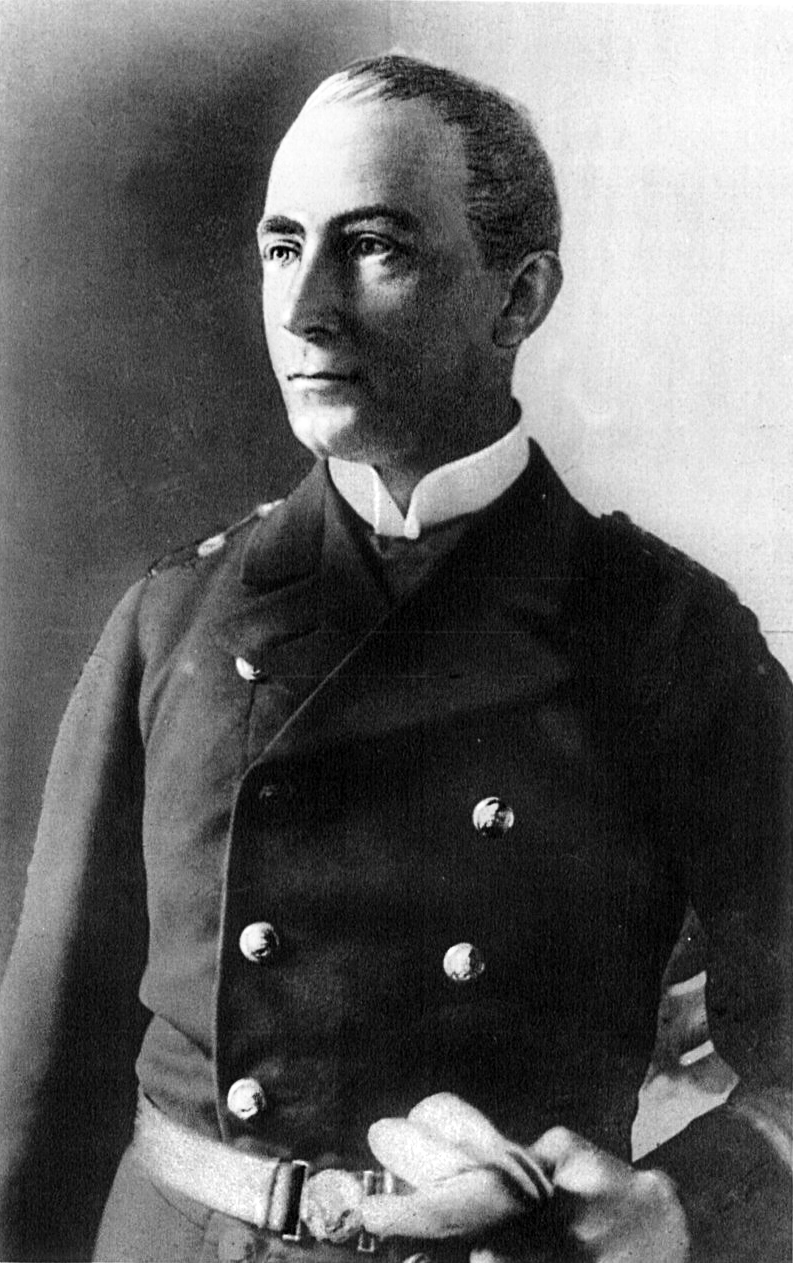
Karl von Müller, who served as the ship's commanding officer from 1913

The two cruisers reinforced German forces at Ponape, which included the old unprotected cruiser Cormoran. The ships bombarded rebel positions and sent a landing force, which included men from the ships along with colonial police troops, ashore in mid-January 1911. By the end of February the revolt had been suppressed, and on 26 February the unprotected cruiser Condor arrived to take over the German presence in the Carolines. Emden and the other ships held a funeral the following day for those killed in the operation, before departing on 1 March for Qingdao via Guam. After arriving on 19 March, she began an annual overhaul. In mid-1911, the ship went on a cruise to Japan, where she accidentally rammed a Japanese steamer during a typhoon. The collision caused damage necessitating another trip to the drydock in Qingdao. She returned to the Yangtze to protect Europeans during the Chinese Revolution that broke out on 10 October. In November, Vizeadmiral (Vice Admiral) Maximilian von Spee replaced Gühler as the commander of the East Asia Squadron.

At the end of the year, Emden won the Kaiser's Schießpreis (Shooting Prize) for excellent gunnery in the East Asia Squadron. In early December, Emden steamed to Incheon to assist the grounded German steamer Deike Rickmers. In May 1913, Korvettenkapitän (Lieutenant Commander) Karl von Müller became the ship's commanding officer; he was soon promoted to Fregattenkapitän (Commander). In mid-June, Emden went on a cruise to the German colonies in the Central Pacific, and was stationed off Nanjing, as fighting between Qing and revolutionary forces raged there. On 26 August, rebels attacked the ship, and Emden's gunners immediately returned fire, silencing the attackers. Emden moved to Shanghai on 14 August.

=== World War I ===
Emden spent the first half of 1914 on the normal routine of cruises in Chinese and Japanese waters without incident. During the July Crisis that followed the assassination of Archduke Franz Ferdinand of Austria, Emden was the only German cruiser in Qingdao; Spee's two armored cruisers, Scharnhorst and Gneisenau, were cruising in the South Pacific and Leipzig was en route to replace Nürnberg off the coast of Mexico. On 31 July, with war days away, Müller put to sea to begin commerce raiding once war had been formally declared. Two days later, on 2 August, Germany declared war on Russia, and the following day, Emden captured the Russian steamer Ryazan. The Russian vessel was sent back to Qingdao, and converted into the auxiliary cruiser Cormoran.

On 5 August, Spee ordered Müller to join him at Pagan Island in the Mariana Islands; Emden left Qingdao the following day along with the auxiliary cruiser Prinz Eitel Friedrich and the collier Markomannia. The ships arrived in Pagan on 12 August. The next day, Spee learned that Japan would enter the war on the side of the Triple Entente and had dispatched a fleet to track his squadron down. Spee decided to take the East Asia Squadron to South America, where it could attempt to break through to Germany, harassing British merchant traffic along the way. Müller suggested that one cruiser be detached for independent operations in the Indian Ocean, since the squadron would be unable to attack British shipping while it was crossing the Pacific. Spee agreed, and allowed Müller to operate independently, since Emden was the fastest cruiser in the squadron.

==== Independent raider ====
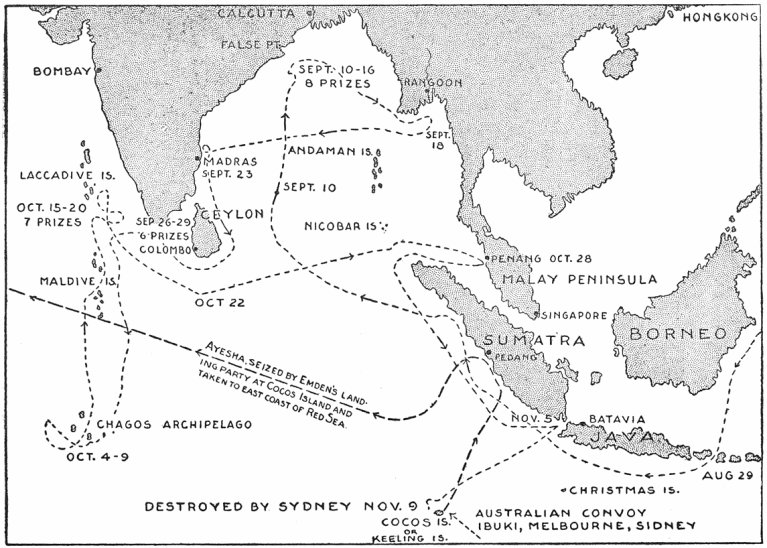
Route taken by Emden during commerce raiding operations

On 14 August, Emden and Markomannia left the company of the East Asia Squadron, bound for the Indian Ocean. Since the cruiser Königsberg was already operating in the western Indian Ocean around the Gulf of Aden, Müller decided he should cruise in the shipping lanes between Singapore, Colombo and Aden. Emden steamed toward the Indian Ocean by way of the Molucca and Banda Seas. While seeking to coal off Jampea Island, the Dutch coastal defense ship Maarten Harpertszoon Tromp stopped Emden and asserted Dutch neutrality. Müller steamed into the Lombok Strait. There, Emden's radio-intercept officers picked up messages from the British armored cruiser HMS Hampshire. To maintain secrecy, Emden's crew rigged up a dummy funnel to impersonate a British light cruiser, then steamed up the coast of Sumatra toward the Indian Ocean.

On 5 September, Emden entered the Bay of Bengal, achieving complete surprise, since the British assumed she was still with Spee's squadron. She operated on shipping routes there without success, until 10 September, when she moved to the Colombo–Calcutta route. There, she captured the Greek collier SS Pontoporos, which was carrying equipment for the British. Müller took the ship into his service and agreed to pay the crew. Emden captured five more ships; troop transports Indus and Lovat and two other ships were sunk, and the fifth, a steamer named Kabinga, was used to carry the crews from the other vessels. On 13 September, Müller released Kabinga and sank two more British prizes, including Clan Matheson. The next day, the Germans paid Clan Matheson's lascar crew to tranship coal from Pontoporos to Emden. Off the Ganges estuary, Emden stopped and searched the Norwegian steamship Dovre. Finding no contraband, they transferred British prisoners to her, and released her. Dovre informed Müller that Entente warships were operating in the area, which persuaded him to return to the eastern coast of India.

Emden stopped and released an Italian freighter, whose crew relayed news of the incident to a British vessel, which in turn informed British naval authorities in the region. The result was an immediate cessation of shipping and the institution of a blackout. Vice Admiral Martyn Jerram ordered Hampshire, Yarmouth, and the Japanese protected cruiser Chikuma to search for Emden. The British armored cruiser Minotaur and the Japanese armored cruiser Ibuki were sent to patrol likely coaling stations.

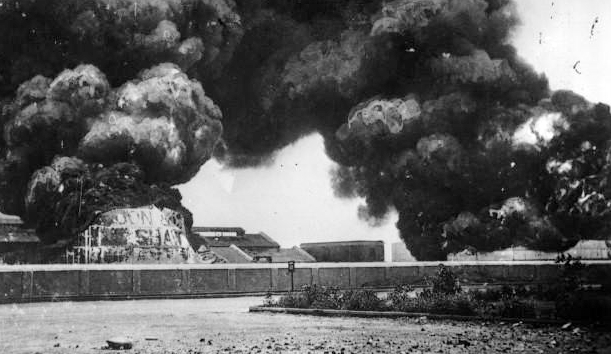
Oil tanks burning at Madras

In late September, Müller decided to bombard Madras. Müller believed the attack would demonstrate his freedom of maneuver and decrease British prestige with the local population. At around 20:00 on 22 September, Emden entered the port, which was completely illuminated, despite the blackout order. Emden closed to within 3,000 yards (2,700 m) from the piers before opening fire. She set fire to two oil tanks and damaged three others, and damaged a merchant ship in the harbor. In the course of the bombardment, Emden fired 130 rounds. The following day, the British again mandated that shipping stop in the Bay of Bengal; during the first month of Emden's raiding career in the Indian Ocean, the value of exports there had fallen by 61.2 percent.

From Madras, Müller had originally intended to rendezvous with his colliers off Simalur Island in Indonesia, but instead decided to make a foray to the western side of Ceylon. On 25 September, Emden sank the British merchantmen Tywerse and King Lund two days before capturing the collier Buresk, which was carrying a cargo of high-grade coal. A German prize crew went aboard Buresk which was used to support Emden's operations. Later that day, the German raider sank the British vessels Ryberia and Foyle. Low on fuel, Emden proceeded to the Maldives, arriving on 29 September and remaining for a day while coal stocks were replenished. The raider then cruised the routes between Aden and Australia and between Calcutta and Mauritius for two days without success. Emden steamed to Diego Garcia for engine maintenance and to rest the crew.

The British garrison at Diego Garcia had not yet learned of the state of war between Britain and Germany, and so treated Emden to a warm reception. She remained there until 10 October, to remove fouling. While searching for merchant ships west of Colombo, Emden picked up Hampshire's wireless signals again; the ship had departed for the Chagos Archipelago on 13 October. The British had captured Markomannia on 12 October, depriving Emden of a collier. On 15 October, Emden captured the British steamer Benmore off Minikoi and sank her the next day. Over the next five days, she captured Troiens, Exfort, Graycefale, Sankt Eckbert, and Chilkana. One was used as a collier, three were sunk, and the fifth was sent to port with the crews of the other vessels. On 20 October, Müller decided to move to a new area of operations.

==== Attack on Penang ====
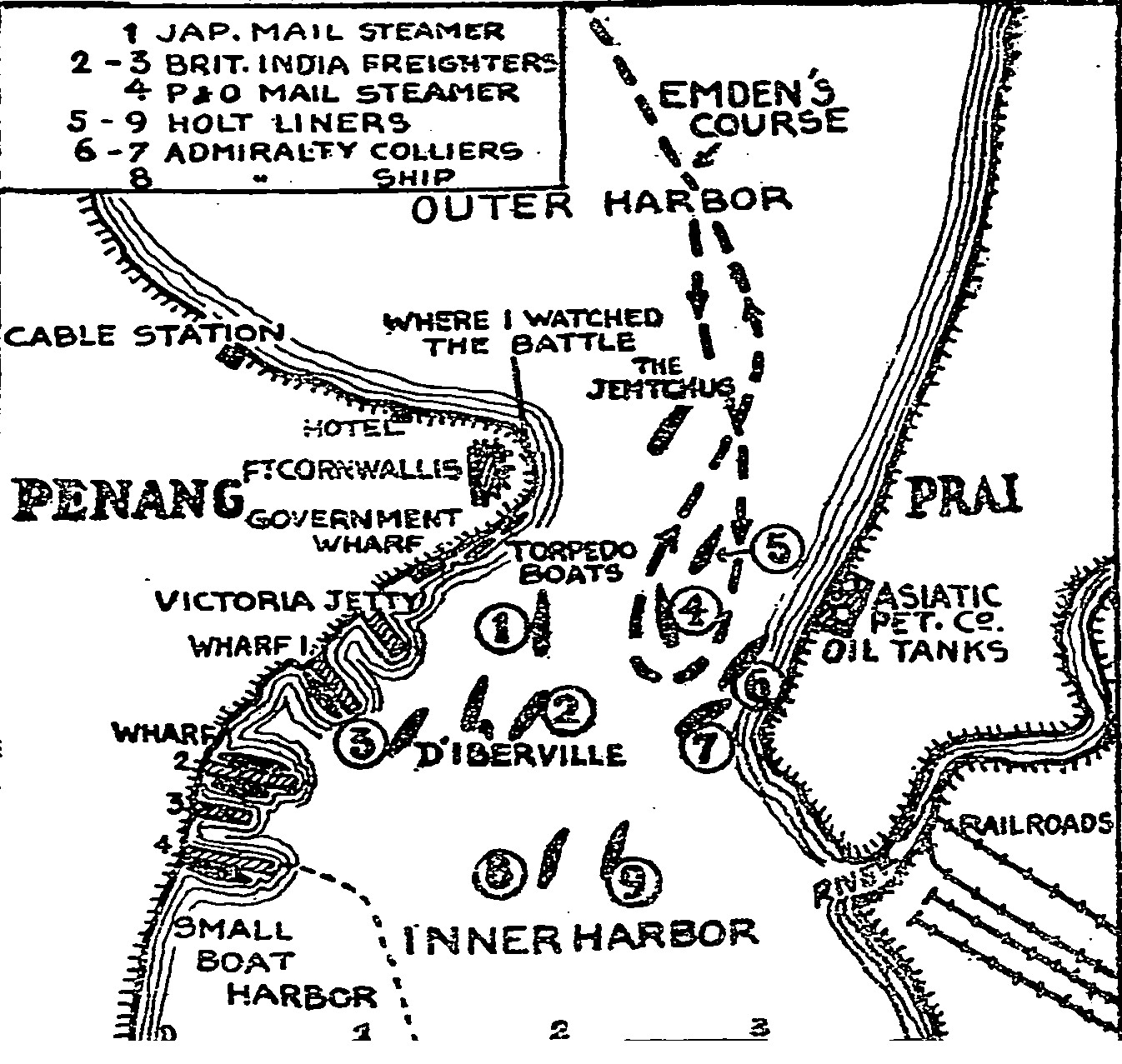
Map showing Emden's movements during the battle

Müller planned a surprise attack on Penang in British Malaya. Emden coaled in the Nicobar Islands and departed for Penang on the night of 27 October, with the departure timed to arrive off the harbor at dawn. She approached the harbor entrance at 03:00 on 28 October, steaming at 18 kn (33 km/h; 21 mph), with the fourth dummy funnel erected to disguise her identity. Emden's lookouts quickly spotted a warship in the port with lights on; it turned out to be the Russian protected cruiser Zhemchug, a veteran of the Battle of Tsushima. Zhemchug had put into Penang for boiler repairs; only one was in service, which meant that she could not get under way, nor were the ammunition hoists powered. Only five rounds of ready ammunition were permitted for each gun, with a sixth chambered. Emden pulled alongside Zhemchug at a distance of 300 yards (270 m); Müller ordered a torpedo to be fired at the Russian cruiser, then gave the order for the 10.5 cm guns to open fire.

Emden quickly inflicted grievous damage on her adversary, then turned around to make another pass at Zhemchug. One of the Russian gun crews managed to get a weapon into action, but scored no hits. Müller ordered a second torpedo to be fired into the burning Zhemchug while his guns continued to batter her. The second torpedo caused a tremendous explosion that tore the ship apart. By the time the smoke cleared, Zhemchug had already slipped beneath the waves, the masts the only parts of the ship still above water. The destruction of Zhemchug killed 81 Russian sailors and wounded 129, of whom seven later died of their injuries. The elderly French torpedo cruiser D'Iberville and the destroyer Fronde opened wildly inaccurate fire on Emden.

Müller then decided to depart, owing to the risk of encountering superior warships. Upon leaving the harbor, he encountered a British freighter, SS Glen Turret, loaded with ammunition, that had already stopped to pick up a harbor pilot. While preparing to take possession of the ship, Emden had to recall her boats having spotted an approaching ship. This proved to be the French destroyer Mousquet, which was unprepared and was quickly destroyed. Emden stopped to pick up survivors and departed at around 08:00 as the other French ships were raising steam to get underway. One officer and thirty-five sailors were plucked from the water. Another French destroyer tried to follow, but lost sight of the German raider in a rainstorm. On 30 October, Emden stopped the British steamer Newburn and put the French sailors aboard after they signed statements promising not to return to the war. The attack on Penang was a significant shock to the Entente powers, and caused them to delay the large convoys from Australia, since they would need more powerful escorts.

==== Battle of Cocos ====
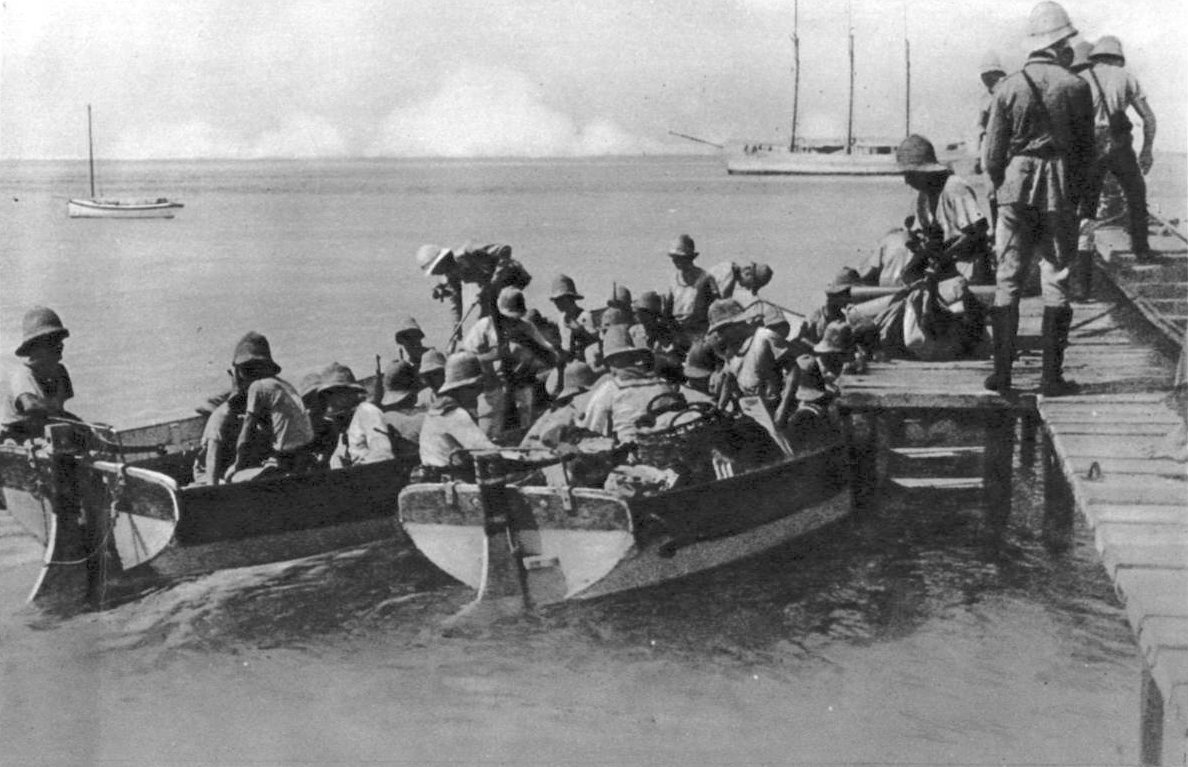
Emden's landing party going ashore on Direction Island; the three-masted Ayesha is visible in the background

After releasing the British steamer, Emden turned south to Simalur, and rendezvoused with the captured collier Buresk. Müller then decided to attack the British coaling station in the Cocos Islands; he intended to destroy the wireless station there and draw away British forces searching for him in the Indian Ocean. While en route to the Cocos, Emden spent two days combing the Sunda Strait for merchant shipping without success. She steamed to the Cocos, arriving off Direction Island at 06:00 on the morning of 9 November. Since there were no British vessels in the area, Müller sent ashore a landing party led by Kapitänleutnant (First Lieutenant) Hellmuth von Mücke, Emden's executive officer. The party consisted of another two officers, six non-commissioned officers, and thirty-eight sailors armed with four machine guns and thirty rifles.

Emden was using jamming, but the British wireless station was able to transmit the message "Unidentified ship off entrance." The message was received by the Australian light cruiser HMAS Sydney, which was 52 nautical miles (96 km; 60 mi) away, escorting a convoy. Sydney immediately headed for the Cocos Islands at top speed. Emden picked up wireless messages from the then unidentified vessel approaching, but believed her to be 250 nautical miles (460 km; 290 mi) away, giving them much more time than they actually had. At 09:00, lookouts aboard Emden spotted smoke on the horizon, and thirty minutes later identified it as a warship approaching at high speed. Mücke's landing party was still ashore, and there was no time left to recover them.

Sydney closed to a distance of 9,500 yards (8,700 m) before turning to a parallel course with Emden. The German cruiser opened fire first, and straddled the Australian vessel with her third salvo. Emden's gunners were firing rapidly, with a salvo every ten seconds; Müller hoped to overwhelm Sydney with a barrage of shells before her heavier armament could take effect. Two shells hit Sydney, one of which disabled the aft fire control station; the other failed to explode. It took slightly longer for Sydney to find the range, and in the meantime, Emden turned toward Sydney in an attempt to close to torpedo range. Sydney's more powerful 6 in (152 mm) guns soon found the range and inflicted serious damage. The wireless compartment was destroyed and the crew for one of the forward guns was killed early in the engagement. At 09:45, Müller turned his ship toward Sydney in another attempt to reach a torpedo firing position. Five minutes later, a shell hit disabled the steering gear, and other fragments jammed the hand steering equipment. Emden could only be steered with her propellers. Sydney's gunfire also destroyed the rangefinders and caused heavy casualties amongst Emden's gun crews.

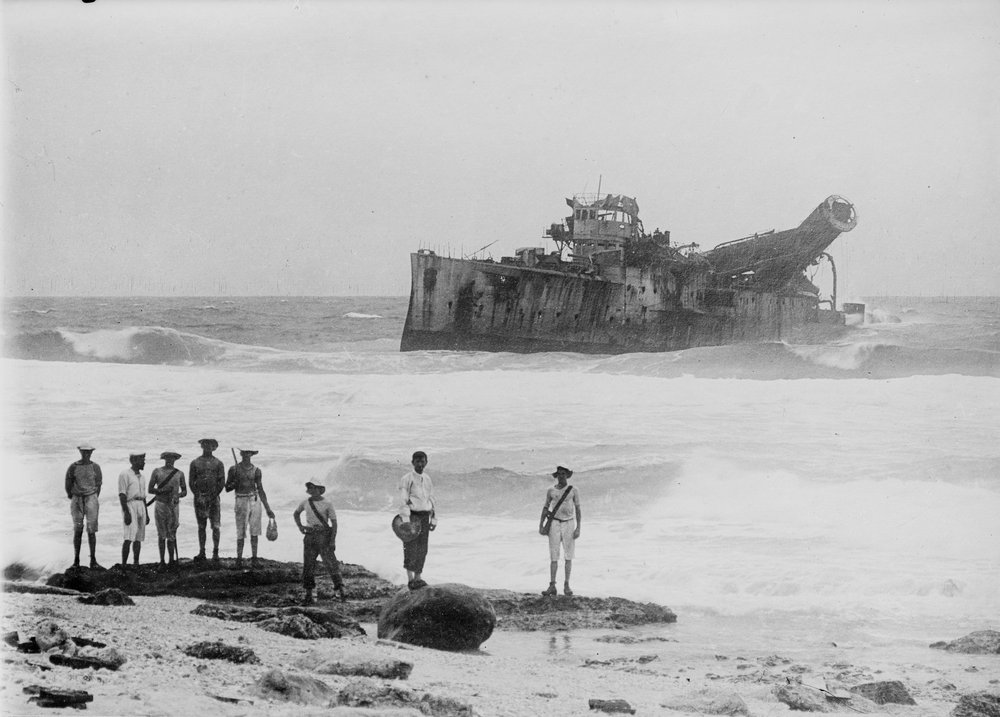
Emden beached on North Keeling Island

Müller made a third attempt to close to torpedo range, but Sydney quickly turned away. Shortly after 10:00, a shell from Sydney detonated ready ammunition near the starboard No. 4 gun and started a serious fire. Emden made a fourth and final attempt to launch a torpedo attack, but Sydney was able to keep the range open. By 10:45, Emden's guns had largely gone silent; the superstructure had been shredded and the two rear-most funnels had been shot away, along with the foremast. Müller realized that his ship was no longer able to fight, and beached Emden on North Keeling Island to save the lives of his crew. At 11:15, Emden was run onto the reef, and the engines and boilers were flooded. Her breech blocks and torpedo aiming gear were thrown overboard to render the weapons unusable, and all signal books and secret papers were burned. Sydney turned to capture the collier Buresk, whose crew scuttled her when the Australian cruiser approached. Sydney then returned to the wrecked Emden and inquired if she surrendered. The signal books had been destroyed by fire and so the Germans could not reply, and since her flag was still flying, Sydney resumed fire. The Germans quickly raised white flags and the Australians ceased fire.

In the course of the action, Emden scored sixteen hits on Sydney, killing three of her crew and wounding another thirteen. A fourth crewman died later from his injuries. Sydney had meanwhile fired some 670 rounds of ammunition, with around 100 hits claimed. Emden had suffered much higher casualties: 133 officers and enlisted men died, out of a crew of 376. Most of the surviving crew, including Müller, were taken into captivity the next day. The wounded men were sent to Australia, while the uninjured were interned at a camp in Malta; the men were returned to Germany in 1920. Mücke's landing party evaded capture. They had observed the battle, and realized that Emden would be destroyed. Mücke therefore ordered the old 97 gross register ton schooner Ayesha to be prepared for sailing. The Germans departed before Sydney reached Direction Island, and sailed to Padang in the Dutch East Indies. From there, they traveled to Yemen, which was then part of the Ottoman Empire, an ally of Germany. They then traveled overland to Constantinople, arriving in June 1915. There, they reported to Vizeadmiral Wilhelm Souchon, the commander of the ex-German battlecruiser Goeben. In the meantime, the British sloop Cadmus arrived at the Cocos Islands about a week after the battle to bury the sailors killed in the battle.

== Legacy ==
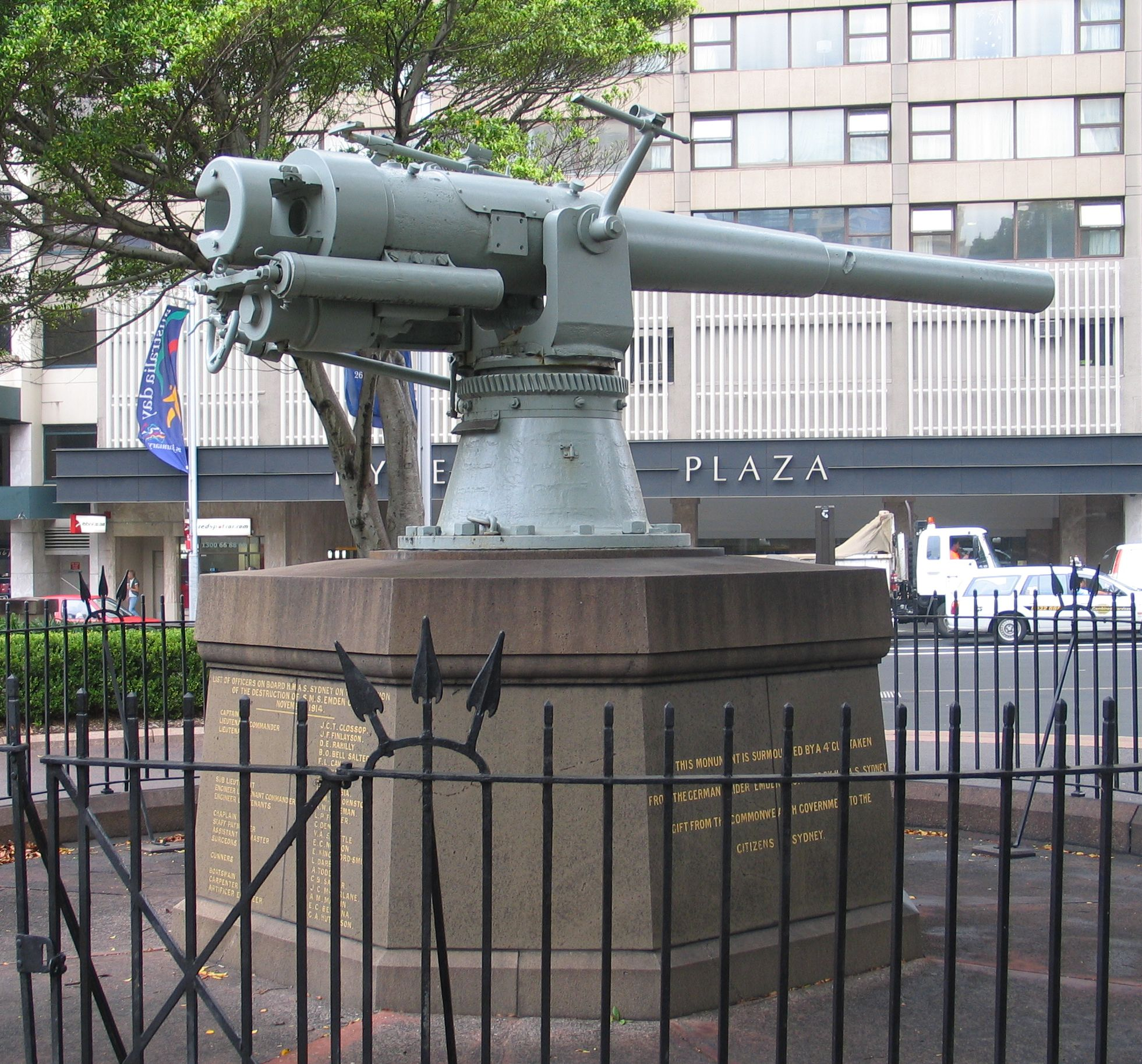
One of Emden's 10.5 cm guns in Hyde Park, Sydney

Over a raiding career spanning three months and 30,000 nautical miles (56,000 km; 35,000 mi), Emden had destroyed two Entente warships and sank or captured sixteen British steamers and one Russian merchant ship, totaling 70,825 gross register tons. Another four British ships were captured and released, and one British and one Greek ship were used as colliers. In 1915, a Japanese company proposed that Emden be repaired and refloated, but an inspection by the elderly flat-iron gunboat HMAS Protector concluded that wave damage to Emden made such an operation unfeasible. By 1919, the wreck had almost completely broken up and disappeared beneath the waves. It was eventually broken up in situ in the early 1950s by a Japanese salvage company; parts of the ship remain scattered around the area.

Following the destruction of Emden, Kaiser Wilhelm II awarded the Iron Cross to the ship and announced that a new Emden would be built to honor the original cruiser. Wilhelm II ordered that the new cruiser wear a large Iron Cross on her bow to commemorate her namesake ship. The third cruiser to bear the name Emden, built in the 1920s for the Reichsmarine, also carried the Iron Cross, along with battle honors for the Indian Ocean, Penang, Cocos Islands, and Ösel, where the second Emden had engaged several Russian destroyers and torpedo boats. Three further vessels have been named for the cruiser in the post-war German Navy, two of which also carried an Iron Cross: the Köln-class frigate Emden laid down in 1959, the Bremen-class frigate Emden laid down in 1979, and the Braunschweig-class corvette Emden laid down in 2020.

Three of the ship's 10.5 cm guns were removed from the wreck three years after the battle. One is preserved in Hyde Park in Sydney, a second is located at the Royal Australian Navy Heritage Centre in HMAS Kuttabul, the main naval base in Sydney, and the third is on display at the Australian War Memorial in Canberra. In addition, Emden's bell and stern ornament were recovered from the wreck and both are currently in the collection of the Australian War Memorial. A number of other artifacts, including a damaged 10.5 cm shell case, an iron rivet from the hull, and uniforms were also recovered and are held in the Australian War Memorial.

In March 1921, the government of Prussia decreed that Prussian former crew members and relatives of those serving aboard the ship during World War I were allowed to add the heritable suffix "-Emden" to their last names as recognition for their service. Other German state governments followed suit. In March 1934, Paul von Hindenburg, who was then the president, decreed that relatives of those who had been killed aboard the ship could also apply for the suffix.

A number of films have been made about Emden's wartime exploits, including the 1915 movies How We Beat the Emden and How We Fought the Emden and the 1928 The Exploits of the Emden, all produced in Australia. German films include the 1926 silent film Unsere Emden, footage from which was incorporated in Kreuzer Emden of 1932, and Heldentum und Todeskampf unserer Emden, produced in 1934. All three films were directed by Louis Ralph. More recently, in 2012, Die Männer der Emden (The men of the Emden) was released, which was made about how the crew of Emden made their way back to Germany after the Battle of Cocos.

After the bombardment of Madras, Emden's name, as "Amdan", entered the Sinhala and Tamil languages meaning "someone who is tough, manipulative and crafty." In the Malayalam language the word "Emadan" means "a big and powerful thing" or "as big as Emden".

== See also ==
- HMAS Sydney I – SMS Emden Memorial
