= How We Beat the Emden =

- Still from the film
- Directed by: Alfred Rolfe
- Production company: Australasian Films
- Release date: 6 December 1915
- Country: Australia
- Languages: Silent film English intertitles

How We Beat the Emden is a 1915 Australian silent film directed by Alfred Rolfe about the Battle of Cocos during World War I. It features footage shot on Cocos Island.

== Plot ==
Jack enlists in the Royal Australian Navy (RAN) and after training on the Tingira, joins the crew of HMAS Sydney. He takes part in the Battle of Cocos, where the Australian cruiser destroys the German light cruiser SMS Emden.

== Cast ==
- Charles Villiers

== Production ==
The film incorporates footage from the documentary How We Fought the Emden.

It was shot at the Rushcutters Bay studio.

== Release ==
The film was popular at the box office. Actor C. Post Mason took a print with him to Canada in 1916 and screened the film over there. It was also known as How We Fought the Emden and The Sydney-Emden Fight.

The Motion Picture News said the film was put on "principally with the idea of drawing patrons from" For Australia and was "merely a succession of interest and topical subjects woven together, and a plot that does not reflect much credit on either the author or producers".

The movie was later combined with another Australian war film, For Australia (1915) to create a new movie, For the Honour of Australia (1916).

== See also ==
- The Exploits of the Emden, a 1928 film by Ken G. Hall, also about the Battle of Cocos
