= Hellmuth von Mücke =

German naval officer (1885–1957)

- Born: 21 June 1881; Zwickau, Kingdom of Saxony, German Empire
- Died: 30 July 1957 (age 76); Ahrensburg, Schleswig-Holstein, West Germany
- Military career
- Allegiance: German Empire
- Branch: Imperial German Navy
- Service years: 1900–1919
- Rank: Corvette Captain
- Conflicts: World War I
- Awards: Iron Cross 1st class

Hellmuth von Mücke (21 June 1881 – 30 July 1957) was an Officer of the Imperial German Navy in the early 20th century and World War I.

== Early life ==
Mücke was born on 21 June 1881 in Zwickau, Saxony. He was a son of an Army Captain who later joined the Imperial Civil Service. At the age of 18, Mücke became a naval cadet and served on the schoolship Charlotte and later the battleship Kaiser Friedrich III. He became Leutnant zur See in September 1903 and was posted to the light cruiser Nymphe. In 1907, he became first officer of the 3rd Torpedo Boat Reserve Half-Flotilla and a year later a flag lieutenant to the Commander of Scouting Forces. He received command of the torpedo boat S.149 in 1910, while simultaneously acting as flag lieutenant for the First Torpedo Boat Flotilla.

== World War I ==
Mücke was the Executive Officer and First Lieutenant of the German Light Cruiser SMS Emden of the Imperial German Navy during his successful career as a commerce raider in the autumn of 1914.

The Emden was a vessel in the East Asia Squadron based at Qingdao. The squadron's commander, Maximilian von Spee, detached it to raid commerce in the Indian Ocean, notably near both Madras and Penang, while he attempted to bring the rest of the squadron back to Germany around Cape Horn.

The Emden intercepted dozens of merchant ships as well as British, French, and Russian military vessels in the Pacific Ocean and Indian Ocean over the next four months. But finally, on 9 November 1914, she encountered and was severely damaged by the larger, faster, and more heavily armed Australian light cruiser, HMAS Sydney in the Battle of Cocos. Emden ran aground to avoid sinking. It was the Ayesha, a wooden topsail schooner owned by Clunies-Ross of Cocos Keeling Islands which Mücke and his men commandeered to escape being taken as prisoners of war, in November 1914, after their ship was destroyed in a battle with the Australian light cruiser HMAS Sydney.

Karl von Müller, the Emden's captain, dispatched Mücke to lead a 53-man landing party onto Direction Island, one of the Cocos (Keeling) Islands northwest of Australia in the Indian Ocean. Mücke's task was to destroy the wireless station and the shore facilities of the important intercontinental communications cable.

Prior to the Emden's arrival, the British wireless operators spotted his smoke on the horizon and sent a wireless message stating an unknown ship was approaching. HMAS Sydney heard the alert and proceeded to Cocos, where he encountered and disabled the Emden.

Mücke and his landing party witnessed the destruction of the Emden from just 17 miles (27 km) away, and realized they had no hope of relief. They seized a derelict, 97-ton, three-masted schooner, the Ayesha, quickly made her seaworthy, and escaped when the Sydney sailed away to capture the Emden's collier, the Buresk. In addition to small arms and 29 rifles, the landing party was equipped with four heavy machine guns. Over the next six months, Mücke led his small command on one of the longest escapes recorded – over 11,000 kilometres (6,800 mi) by sea and land – losing only one man to disease and three to enemy action, a remarkable achievement for the times.

== Return to Europe ==
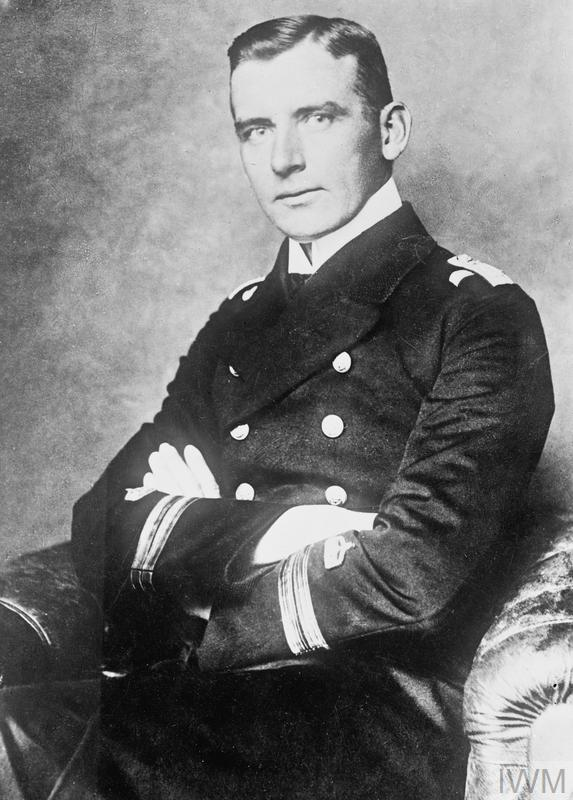
Portrait of von Mücke from 1912, from the archives of the Imperial War Museum

In November 1914, after their ship was destroyed in a battle with the Australian light cruiser HMAS Sydney, Mücke commandeered a topsail wooden schooner, Ayesha, to escape being taken as prisoners of war. The Ayesha was owned by Clunies-Ross of Cocos Keeling Islands. The party set sail from Direction Island.

Initially Mücke sailed his small command (numbering five officers, one surgeon, and 47 petty officers and men) to the Dutch port of Padang on the west coast of Sumatra. There he arranged a rendezvous with a German freighter in port, the Choising, which transported them to the Ottoman Empire's port city of Hodeida, Yemen. Once on the Arabian Peninsula, Mücke and his men experienced months of delay securing the financial assistance of local Turkish officials to return to Germany. At last he decided to lead his men on an over-water voyage up the east coast of the Red Sea to Jeddah, and thence to Medina, then the southern terminus of the Hejaz Railway. A retired Ottoman official and his young wife travelled with them, as that was part of the deal. However, one of his small dhows sunk on the coral reefs near the Farasan Islands, and they commenced a dangerous overland journey along the Red Sea. Approaching Jeddah they were beset by hundreds of armed Bedouin tribesmen in a three-day battle that claimed one officer and had two enlisted men killed. They were eventually relieved by the Emir of Mecca. Mücke believed the hostile Bedouins had been hired by the British, based on weapons captured from killed Bedouin tribesmen. While guests of the Emir of Mecca at Jeddah, Mücke grew uneasy and feared being held as a hostage for political bartering. He sent one of his Arabic-speaking enlisted men to the Jeddah harbour in order to arrange for a dhow. Under cover of night Mücke and his sailors sneaked away and made it by dhow to the northern Hijaz fishing town of Al Wajh. From there they marched further inland until they reached the Hejaz Railway. Finally, in May 1915, Mücke and 48 other survivors boarded a train at Al-'Ula and eventually reached Constantinople, the capital of Germany's ally, Turkey, from which they returned to Germany.

== Post-war career ==
The arrival of Mücke and his men back in Germany, after their successful commerce raiding cruise, and long and arduous return voyage, was greeted with widespread acclaim. In 1915, Mücke wrote two books about his adventures – The Emden and The Ayesha both of which were translated into English for the American market.

In 1915, he married an American orphan, Carla, who had been adopted by a German mercantile family in Baltimore, Maryland, and who was then living in Germany. Her biological parents, of Norwegian descent, were Torbjorn Hammeraas and Carolina Vestnes-Hameraas. Between 1918 and 1938 the couple had three daughters and three sons. In 1922, he traveled to the United States to promote his books and was well received by American audiences.

The effects of World War I and the Versailles Treaty on his homeland jaded him considerably. Like many of his fellow officers, he joined conservative political movements after the war. In 1918, he joined the German National People's Party, but moved to the German Workers' Party (DAP) in 1919. The DAP became the National Socialist German Workers Party in 1920, and Mücke was elected as a Nazi member of the Saxony Landtag in 1926. However, by 1929 he had become disenchanted with the personality cult associated with Adolf Hitler's leadership of the party. Turning against Hitler, he reconsidered his position regarding re-armament, left the Nazi Party, embraced pacifism, and lectured and wrote extensively on the subject.

Following the appointment of Hitler as Chancellor of Germany in 1933, Mücke became a much more vocal opponent of the regime. The Party banned his writings as subversive, and in 1936 he was briefly imprisoned for political dissent in Konzentrationslager Kiel as a warning to cease his opposition. Although he volunteered to rejoin the German Navy as World War II approached, he was considered politically unreliable, and was ordered back to the camps for the duration of the war by Hitler himself in 1939. Afterwards, he was imprisoned in Konzentrationslager Fuhlsbüttel in Hamburg. However, the Reichsstatthalter of Hamburg, Karl Kaufmann, considered Mücke a national hero for his service in World War I, ignored Hitler's directive, and released Mücke after several months, citing that he was too ill for imprisonment. The family was moved from their home on the island of Föhr during this unstable period, and was finally settled inland, in Ahrensburg, Schleswig-Holstein, where Mücke lived from 1940 until his death.

Mücke's oldest son and name-sake was killed on the Russian Front in 1943.

After the war, Mücke continued peace activism, opposing rearmament in 1950s West Germany. He died of a heart attack on 30 July 1957.

== Works ==
- The Emden-ayesha Adventure: German Raiders in the South Seas and Beyond, 1914. Naval Institute Press; Rev Ed edition (1 Aug 2000). ISBN 978-1-55750-873-7.
- The Ayesha. Allan, London (1930).
- The Emden. Ritter (1917).
