= Caroline Pugliese =

Australian theatre proprietor (1865–1940)

Caroline Frances Pugliese
- Born: Caroline France Donaldson; 17 February 1865; Five Dock, New South Wales, Australia
- Died: 4 May 1940 (aged 75); Coogee, New South Wales, Australia
- Occupations: Entrepreneur and film producer
- Known for: Owning cinemas and making films
- Spouse: Antonio Pugliese
- Children: 7

Caroline Frances Pugliese (17 February 1865 – 4 May 1940) was an Australian theatre proprietor. She was involved in creating three early Australian films.

== Early life ==
Caroline Frances Donaldson was born on 17 February 1865 in the Sydney suburb of Five Dock in 1865. Her parents were both immigrants, her mother Mary (born Vidler) was English and her father James Donaldson was a gardener who was born in Ireland.

== Career ==
After her marriage to Antonio Pugliese in 1883, she acquired two step-children from his first marriage. In 1909 the family owned three cinemas in New South Wales. These were the Alhambra in the Haymarket (formerly Sydney's first music hall), (Note: After being built as a bazaar or auction room in 1884 it was converted into a concert hall, opening on 28 July. After being expanded to accommodate around 800 people, It became Sydney's first music hall in the 1890s, and variously known as the Academy of Music (1884–1885), Haymarket Academy (1884–1885), and The Melba (1914–1918). After being used as a cinema in the 1920s, it later became a storehouse for Mick Simmons.) the Star Theatre in Bondi, and the Broadway in Leichhardt.

It was Caroline Pugliese who decided what the business should do, and she controlled the money. Other members of the Pugliese made the cinemas projectors work and operated front of house.

Film distribution was a competitive business and the Pugliese experienced problems in accessing the films they wanted, so in 1917 they decided to make their own. Raymond Longford created a script and directed The Church and the Woman, about a marriage between a Catholic and a Protestant. The film faced legal challenges. The first which was suspected to be a publicity stunt was an objection that the title was too similar to another film. The second challenge had more weight. It became apparent that Longford had borrowed the story from Edward Finn's book A Priest's Secret under seal of confession, published in the 1880s. The film had been a major commercial success but this spoilt when the courts ruled in Edward Finn's favour and awarded him a share of the profits and the prints of the film. Longford had infringed the copyright but Caroline's son Herbert was charged with enabling the breach and the Puglieses lost the case.

== Personal life and death ==
In 1883 Pugliese married an Italian-born labourer named Antonio Pugliese at St John's, Ashfield in Sydney. She was his second wife and he already had two children.

Antonio died in 1916 and their eldest child Umberto (a.k.a. Herbert) was described as "a charmer". In 1920 Herbert/Umberto went to court to demand that his wife should return to their home. His wife refused, blaming him for being so dependant on his mother.

Pugliese died in the Sydney suburb of Coogee on 4 May 1940.
