= How We Fought the Emden =

- Newcastle Herald 18 June 1915
- Directed by: Charles Cusden
- Cinematography: Charles Cusden
- Production company: Cocos Island Syndicate
- Release date: 14 June 1915
- Country: Australia
- Languages: Silent film English intertitles

How We Fought the Emden is a 1915 Australian silent documentary film from cinematographer Charles Cusden about the Battle of Cocos during World War I, where the Australian ship Sydney sunk the Emden.

It was also known as The Fate of the Emden.

The documentary includes pictures of the Emden and her officers prior to the engagement, the Sydney, her commander (Captain Glossop), officers and crew, the wireless station, the operator who sent the message that brought out the Sydney.

== Production ==
In March 1915, members of the Millions Club in Sydney formed a Cocos Island Syndicate and organised an expedition to make a film about the defeat of the Emden during the Battle of Cocos. Cinematographer Charles Cusden sailed to the island on the SS Hanley and shot about 1,000 feet (300 m) of film in and around the battered ship, which had been beached on North Keeling Island.

Cusden returned to Sydney on 26 May 1915.

== Release ==
The film debuted at the Strand cinema in Sydney in June 1915. Relics of the Emden had been brought back and were displayed at the cinema. This run was well received.

The film screened throughout Australia as Fate of the Emden.

The film screened on a program of war pictures in Adelaide in 1916 as How We Fought the Emden.

Footage from the movie was later incorporated into the films How We Beat the Emden (1915) and For the Honour of Australia (1916).
