= List of shipwrecks in the Indian Ocean =

This is a partial list of shipwrecks which occurred in the Indian Ocean. The list includes ships that sank, foundered, grounded, or were otherwise lost. The Indian Ocean is here defined in its widest sense, including its marginal seas: the Arabian Sea, the Bay of Bengal, the Great Australian Bight, the Mozambique Channel, the Persian Gulf, the Red Sea, the Strait of Malacca, and the Timor Sea.

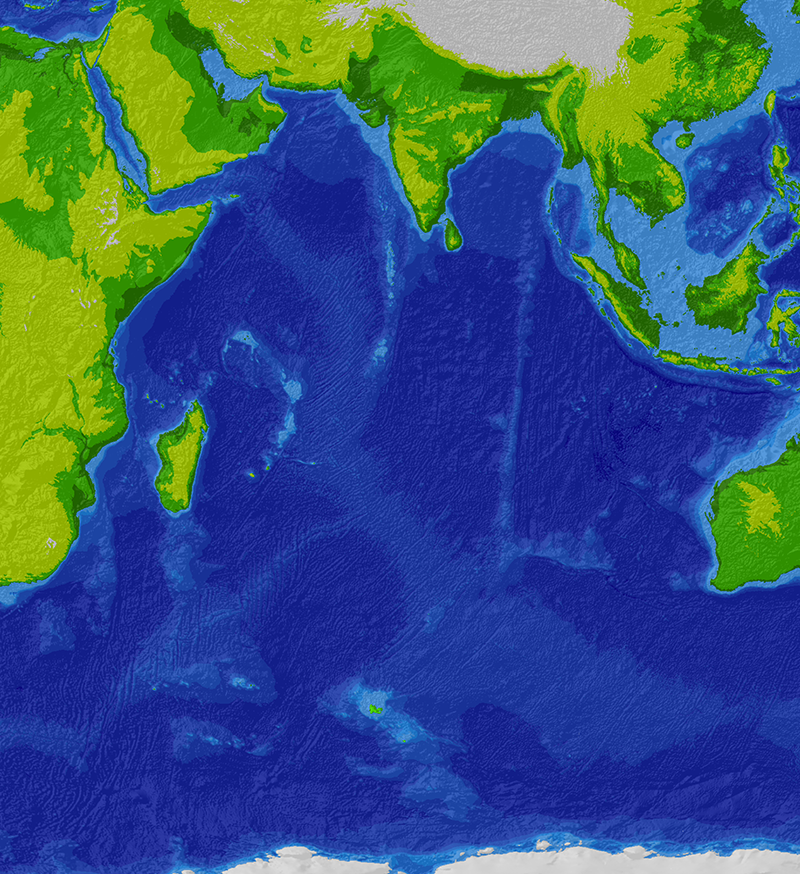
Map of the Indian Ocean

== Arabian Sea ==
| Ship | Flag | Sunk date | Notes | Coordinates |
|---|---|---|---|---|
| Aden | United Kingdom | 9 June 1897 | A P&O steamship that was wrecked on the island of Socotra off the coast of Yemen. | |
| Albert Gallatin | United States | 2 January 1944 | A Liberty ship torpedoed 60 nautical miles (110 km; 69 mi) off the Arabian Peninsula by the Japanese submarine I-26. | 21°21′N 059°58′E |
| Berwyn | United States Navy | 6 September 1920 | A cargo ship that was wrecked near the Khuriya Muriya Islands. | 17°44′N 056°38′E |
| E.G. Seubert | United States | 22 February 1944 | A tanker that was torpedoed by U-510. | 13.50°N 48.93°E |
| Georges Philippar | France | 19 May 1932 | An ocean liner that caught fire and sank near Mukalla, Yemen. | 14°20′N 50°25′E |
| John A. Poor | United States | 19 March 1944 | A Liberty ship carrying mail and a variety of cargo that was torpedoed by U-510. | 13°58′N 70°30′E |
| John Barry | United States | 28 August 1944 | A Liberty ship that was torpedoed by the German submarine U-859 off the coast of Oman. | 15.10°N 55.18°E |
| Kadakkarapally Boat | Unknown | 11–12th century | A wreck that was discovered in a coconut grove near Kadakkarappally, Kerala, that dates from around 1020–1160 AD. | |
| PNS Khaibar | Pakistan Navy | 4 December 1971 | A Battle-class destroyer that was sunk by he Indian Navy missile boat INS Nirghat south of Karachi, Pakistan. | |
| INS Khukri | Indian Navy | 9 December 1971 | A Blackwood-class frigate that was torpedoed by the Pakistan Navy submarine PNS Hangor off Diu, India. | 20°16′38″N 70°59′37″E |
| MOL Comfort | Bahamas | 17 June 2013 | A container ship that broke apart in bad weather on 17 June 2013. The stern section took on water and sank on 26 June; the bow was taken under tow, but caught fire and sank on 11 July. | 14°26′N 66°26′E, 19°56′N 65°25′E |
| Montanan | United States | 3 June 1943 | A cargo ship that was torpedoed by the Imperial Japanese Navy submarine I-27 150 nautical miles (280 km; 170 mi) south of Masirah Island, Oman. | 17°05′04″N 58°05′00″E |
| Tarifa | United States | 7 March 1944 | A merchant ship carrying cargo, mail and soldiers from Australia and New Zealand that was torpedoed by U-510. | 12°N 48°E |

== Bay of Bengal ==
| Ship | Flag | Sunk date | Notes | Coordinates |
|---|---|---|---|---|
| Automedon | United Kingdom | 11 November 1940 | A refrigerated cargo ship sunk by the German auxiliary cruiser Atlantis northwest of Sumatra. | |
| Braut Team | Norway | 7 June 1991 | The cargo ship, a 15-year-old vessel, sank east of Sri Lanka. Water began flooding the cargo holds on 6 June. The cargo included ferro silicum and a new Chinese steam locomotive bound for the United States. All 17 crewmen were rescued. | 6°4′N 88°51′E |
| Daisy Moller | United Kingdom | 14 December 1943 | A cargo ship that was torpedoed by Japanese Navy submarine RO-110. | |
| HMS Hermes | Royal Navy | 9 April 1942 | The world's first purpose-built aircraft carrier, sunk by Imperial Japanese Navy aircraft about 39 nautical miles (72 km; 45 mi) northwest of Batticaloa, Ceylon. | 7°35′N 82°5′E |
| PNS Ghazi | Pakistan Navy | 4 December 1971 | A Tench-class submarine that sank in unknown circumstances off Visakhapatnam, during the Indo-Pakistani War. | |
| Indus | United Kingdom | 10 September 1914 | A steamship captured and scuttled by the Imperial German Navy light cruiser SMS Emden. | 11°00′N 83°45′E |
| Ro-110 | Imperial Japanese Navy | 11 February 1944 | A Ro-100-class submarine sunk by the Royal Indian Navy sloop HMIS Jumna and the Royal Australian Navy corvettes HMAS Ipswich and HMAS Launceston 200 nautical miles (370 km; 230 mi) northeast of Madras, India. | 17°25′N 083°21′E |
| Selma City | United States | 7 April 1942 | A cargo ship sunk by Imperial Japanese Navy aircraft about 25 nautical miles (46 km; 29 mi) off from Vizagapatam (now Vishakhapatnam), India. | 17°11′N 83°20′E |
| HMAS Vampire | Royal Australian Navy | 9 April 1942 | A V-class destroyer sunk by Imperial Japanese Navy aircraft off the coast of Ceylon. | 7°35′N 82°5′E |

== Central Indian Ocean ==
| Ship | Flag | Sunk date | Notes | Coordinates |
|---|---|---|---|---|
| Arnhem | Dutch East India Company | 12 February 1662 | An East Indiaman that ran aground on the Saint Brandon Rocks. | |
| Berwickshire | United Kingdom | 20 August 1944 | A merchant ship that was torpedoed by U-861. | 30°58′S 38°50′E |
| Chivalry | United Kingdom | 22 February 1944 | A cargo ship that was sunk by a Japanese submarine. | 0°50′S 68°0′E |
| City of Johannesburg | United Kingdom | 23 October 1942 | A merchant steamer that was torpedoed by U-504 off East London, South Africa. | 33°20′S 29°30′E |
| Clan Macarthur | United Kingdom | 12 August 1943 | A Cameron-class cargo steamship that was torpedoed by U-181 off Madagascar. | 23°S 53.11°E |
| Commissaire Ramel | France | 9 September 1940 | A passenger ship that was sunk by the German auxiliary cruiser Atlantis. | 28°25′S 74°23′E |
| Cornelia P. Spencer | United States | 21 September 1943 | A Liberty ship that was carrying 2,910 tons of steel and 300 tons of gum arabic that was sunk by U-188. | 2°08′N 50°10′E |
| HMS Cornwall | Royal Navy | 5 April 1942 | A County-class heavy cruiser that was sunk by Japanese dive bombers in the Easter Sunday Raid. | 1°54′N 77°54′E |
| IRIS Dina | Islamic Republic of Iran Navy | 4 March 2026 | An County-class frigate that was sunk by a torpedo by a US submarine off the coast of Sri Lanka during the 2026 Iran War of the coast of Sri Lanka. It was the first ship sunk by a torpedo of an American vessel since the end of World War 2. | |
| HMS Dorsetshire | Royal Navy | 5 April 1942 | A County-class heavy cruiser that was sunk by Japanese dive bombers in the Easter Sunday Raid. | 1°54′N 77°45′E |
| Empire Chaucer | United Kingdom | 17 October 1942 | A cargo ship that was torpedoed by U-504 about 450 nautical miles (830 km; 520 mi) south of Cape Town, South Africa. | 38°12′S 20°04′E |
| Empire Day | United Kingdom | 7 August 1944 | A cargo ship that was torpedoed by U-198 about 200 nautical miles (370 km; 230 mi) east of Dar es Salaam, Tanzania. | 7°06′S 42°00′E |
| Fort Lee | United States | 2 November 1944 | A T2 tanker that was torpedoed by U-181. | 27°35′S 83°11′E |
| Fort Longueuil | United Kingdom | 19 September 1943 | A North Sands-class cargo ship that was torpedoed by U-532. 57 out of the 57 onboard died in the sinking with two crew members surviving after being at sea for 143 days before coming ashore to Sumatra where they were taken prisoner by the Japanese. | 10°00′S 68°00′E |
| Frontier | South Africa | 27 September 1957 | A cargo ship that ran aground east of East London, Eastern Cape, Africa. | |
| Hoihow | United Kingdom | 2 July 1943 | A passenger ship that was torpedoed by U-181. | 19°30′S 55°30′E |
| I-27 | Imperial Japanese Navy | 12 February 1944 | A Type B1 submarine sunk by the British destroyers HMS Paladin and HMS Petard. | 01°25′N 72°22′E |
| I-60 | Imperial Japanese Navy | 17 January 1942 | A Kaidai 3B-type submarine sunk by the British destroyer HMS Jupiter south of the Sunda Strait. | 06°19′30″S 104°49′20″E |
| James B. Stephens | United States | 8 March 1943 | A Liberty ship that was torpedoed by U-160 about 150 miles (240 km) northeast of Durban, South Africa. | 28°53′S 33°18′E |
| Khedive Ismail | United Kingdom | 12 February 1944 | A steamship that was torpedoed by I-27, with 1,297 deaths. | 01°25′N 72°22′E |
| Koning der Nederlanden | Netherlands | 5 October 1881 | An ocean liner that sprang a leak and sank east of the Seychelles. | 5°14′S 64°7′E |
| Kormoran | Kriegsmarine | 19 November 1941 | A merchant raider that sank off Western Australia near Carnarvon due to damage sustained in combat with the Australian light cruiser Sydney. | 26°05′46″S 111°04′33″E |
| USS Langley | United States Navy | 27 February 1942 | A seaplane tender scuttled 75 nautical miles (139 km; 86 mi) south of Tjilatjap, Java, after sustaining damage in an attack by Imperial Japanese Navy aircraft. | 08°51′04.2″S 109°02′02.6″E |
| Lapérouse | French Navy | 31 July 1898 | A Lapérouse-class unprotected cruiser wrecked during a storm on the coast of Madagascar at Anosy. | |
| Magicienne | French Navy | 24 August 1810 | A Magicienne-class frigate that ran aground off Mauritius in the Battle of Grand Port. | |
| Marietta E | United Kingdom | 4 March 1943 | A cargo ship that was torpedoed by U-160. | 31.49°S 31.11°E |
| Monge | French Navy | 8 May 1942 | A Redoutable-class submarine sunk by the Royal Navy destroyers HMS Active and HMS Panther off Diego-Suarez, Madagascar, during the Battle of Madagascar. | |
| Oceanos | Greece | 4 August 1991 | A cruise ship that sank off Coffee Bay, South Africa. | 32°07′15″S 029°07′13″E |
| USS Pecos | United States Navy | 1 March 1942 | A Kanawha-class fleet replenishment oiler sunk by Imperial Japanese Navy aircraft south of Java. | 14°27′S 106°11′E |
| HMS Pegasus | Royal Navy | 20 September 1914 | A Pelorus-class protected cruiser that sank in the harbor at Zanzibar due to damage sustained earlier in the day in combat with the Imperial German Navy light cruiser SMS Königsberg during the Battle of Zanzibar. | 06°08′54″S 039°11′36″E |
| Pinguin | Kriegsmarine | 8 May 1941 | An auxiliary cruiser that was sunk by HMS Cornwall. | 3°30′0″N 57°48′0″E |
| HMS Plym | Royal Navy | 3 October 1952 | A River-class frigate obliterated in the Monte Bello Islands off Western Australia by the detonation of an atomic bomb within her hull in Operation Hurricane, a British nuclear test. | |
| Ramb I | Regia Marina | 27 February 1941 | An auxiliary cruiser that was sunk by HMNZS Leander in the action of 27 February 1941. | 1°0′N 68°30′E |
| Samuel Heintzelman | United States | 9 July 1943 | A Liberty ship that was torpedoed by U-511. Originally it was believed that it was sunk by a Japanese surface raider. There would be no survivors of the ship from the sinking. | 9°00′S 81°00′E |
| HMS Sirius | Royal Navy | 23 August 1810 | A frigate that ran aground off Mauritius in the Battle of Grand Port. | |
| HMAS Sydney | Royal Australian Navy | 19 November 1941 | A Leander-class light cruiser that sank off Western Australia near Carnarvon due to damage sustained in combat with the German merchant raider Kormoran. | 26°14′31″S 111°12′48″E |
| Texanita | Liberia | 21 August 1972 | An oil tanker that collided with Oswego-Guardian off Stilbaai, South Africa. | 34.80°S 21.40°E |
| Tjisalak | Netherlands | 26 March 1944 | A cargo ship that was torpedoed by I-8. | 2°30′S 78°40′E |
| RIMS Warren Hastings | Royal Indian Marine | 14 January 1897 | A troopship that hit a rock and was wrecked off Réunion. | |

=== Christmas Island ===
| Ship | Flag | Sunk date | Notes | Coordinates |
|---|---|---|---|---|
| Eidsvold | Norway | 20 January 1942 | A motor vessel torpedoed by the Imperial Japanese Navy submarine I-159 at Flying Fish Cove. | |
| Janga ("SIEV-221") | Indonesia | 15 December 2010 | A fishing boat that hit the rocks at Flying Fish Cove while carrying asylum seekers from Iraq and Iran. | 10°25′1″S 105°40′24″E |
| Tycoon | Panama | 8 January 2012 | A cargo ship wrecked at Flying Fish Cove. | |

=== Cocos (Keeling) Islands ===
| Ship | Flag | Sunk date | Notes | Coordinates |
|---|---|---|---|---|
| Buresk | Germany | 9 November 1914 | A collier scuttled while under attack by the Royal Australian Navy light cruiser HMAS Sydney in the Battle of Cocos. | |
| SMS Emden | Imperial German Navy | 9 November 1914 | The wreck of SMS Emden A light cruiser run aground and wrecked while under attack by the Royal Australian Navy light cruiser HMAS Sydney during the Battle of Cocos. | |

== Great Australian Bight ==
| Ship | Flag | Sunk date | Notes | Coordinates |
|---|---|---|---|---|
| Mahomed Shah | United Kingdom | April 1853 | A barque that caught fire on 18 April 1853 and sank several days later. All on board were rescued. | 40°10′00″S 119°10′00″E |
| Selje | Norway | 29 March 1929 | A cargo ship that collided with the steamship Kaituna 25 nautical miles (46 km; 29 mi) southwest of Cape Otway, Victoria, Australia. | |

== Mozambique Channel ==
| Ship | Flag | Sunk date | Notes | Coordinates |
|---|---|---|---|---|
| Admiral Gambier | United Kingdom | 20 June 1817 | An East Indiaman wrecked on a coral reef. | |
| Bévéziers | French Navy | 5 May 1942 | A Redoutable-class submarine sunk by Royal Navy Fleet Air Arm aircraft west of Cap d'Ambre, Madagascar, during the Battle of Madagascar. | |
| Breiviken | Norway | 4 July 1943 | A merchant ship that was sunk by U-178. | 21°50′S 37°50′E |
| Empire City | United Kingdom | 6 August 1944 | A cargo ship torpedoed by the German submarine U-198 off Mocímboa da Praia, Mozambique. | 11°33′S 41°25′E |
| Express | United States | 30 June 1942 | A Type C3-E cargo ship torpedoed by the Imperial Japanese Navy submarine I-10. | 23°30′S 37°30′E |
| Le Héros | French Navy | 7 May 1942 | A Redoutable-class submarine sunk by Royal Navy Fleet Air Arm aircraft off Courrier Bay, Madagascar, during the Battle of Madagascar. | 12°03′45″S 049°03′30″E |
| Mary Livanos | Greece | 11 July 1943 | A steam merchant ship torpedoed by U-178. | 15°40′S 40°45′E |
| Robert Bacon | United States | 14 July 1943 | A Liberty ship torpedoed by the German submarine U-178. | 15°25′S 41°13′E |

== Persian Gulf ==
| Ship | Flag | Sunk date | Notes | Coordinates |
|---|---|---|---|---|
| Iran Ajr | Islamic Republic of Iran Navy | 26 September 1987 | A landing craft that served as a minelayer during the Iran–Iraq War, captured and scuttled by United States Navy forces. | |
| U-533 | Kriegsmarine | 16 October 1943 | A Type IXC/40 U-boat sunk by British aircraft off Fujairah. | 25°28′N 56°50′E |

== Red Sea ==
| Ship | Flag | Sunk date | Notes | Coordinates |
|---|---|---|---|---|
| Aida | Egypt | 15 September 1957 | A French-built (1911) lighthouse tender of Egypt's Ports and Lighthouses Administration, driven onto the reef at Big Brother Island in heavy seas on 15 September 1957 while resupplying the island station; all aboard were rescued. | 26°19′N 34°50′E |
| Al-Baraqua II | Djibouti | 6 April 2006 | A capsized passenger ferry. | |
| al-Salam Boccaccio 98 | Egypt | 3 February 2006 | Capsized passenger ferry. | 27.033°N 34.883°E |
| Carnatic | United Kingdom | 15 September 1869 | Ran aground on a coral reef on 12 September, broke in half and sank three days later. 31 people drowned. | 27°34′N 33°55′E |
| Chrisoula K | Greece | 31 August 1981 | A cargo ship that ran aground on a reef. | 27°34′53″N 33°55′55″E |
| Dunraven | United Kingdom | 22 April 1876 | A merchant ship that hit a reef and sank in the Gulf of Suez, close to the Sinai Peninsula. | 27.4215°N 34.0730°E |
| Miniya | Egyptian Navy | 6 February 1970 | A T43-class minesweeper (pennant 302) sunk by Israeli Air Force aircraft at the Hurghada anchorage during the War of Attrition, in reprisal for an Egyptian frogman attack on Eilat harbour the previous night. Now a recreational dive site, commonly called the "El Mina wreck". | 27°13′55″N 33°51′34″E |
| Giannis D | Greece | 19 April 1983 | A cargo ship that sank with its cargo of timber at Sha'ab Abu Nuhas, north of Hurghada. | |
| Giovanni Acerbi | Regia Marina | 4 April 1941 | A torpedo boat sunk in port at Massawa by British aircraft. | |
| Kimon M | Panama | 12 December 1978 | A cargo ship which sank on at Sha'ab Abu Nuhas, north of Hurghada, when she ran into the reef of Abu Nuhas. | 27°34′48″N 33°56′00″E |
| Macallé | Regia Marina | 15 June 1940 | A Adua-class submarine that was scuttled southeast of Port Sudan after the crew became "incapacitated" because of fumes leaking out of the submarine's air conditioning system. | 19°13′N 38°09′E |
| Nazario Sauro | Italy | 6 April 1941 | A merchant-passenger ship that was scuttled at Nakura on Dalac Island off Eritrea. | |
| Numidia | United Kingdom | 20 July 1901 | A British Anchor Line cargo steamer wrecked on the reef at Big Brother Island on 20 July 1901 while carrying railway stock from Liverpool to Calcutta; all 97 crew were saved. | 26°19′N 34°50′E |
| Rosalie Moller | United Kingdom | October 1941 | A cargo ship bombed two days after the supply ship Thistlegorm—– anchored some 20 nautical miles (37 km; 23 mi) away off the Sinai Peninsula — was sunk. She rests north of Hurghada, north of the reefs of Abu Nuhas, in some 50 meters (164 ft) of water. | 27°39′03″N 33°46′17″E |
| Salem Express | Egypt | 17 December 1991 | The passenger ship ran into a shallow reef and sank 57 nautical miles (106 km; 66 mi) south of Hurghada, after the captain took a shortcut on his trip from Jeddah, Saudi Arabia, to Safaga, Egypt. | 26°38′22.02″N 34°3′39.9″E |
| Steel Seafarer | United States | 5 September 1941 | A cargo ship that was sunk by a German plane. | |
| Thistlegorm | United Kingdom | 6 October 1941 | A cargo ship sunk by German bombers near Sharm el-Sheikh. | 27°48′51″N 33°55′12″E |
| Umbria | Italy | 9 June 1940 | A cargo ship scuttled by her crew near Port Sudan. | 19°38′19″N 37°19′38″E |
| Vincenzo Giordano Orsini | Regia Marina | 8 April 1941 | A torpedo boat scuttled in the harbor entrance at Massawa. | |
| Zingara | Italy | 22 August 1984 | Commonly referred to as Kormoran, a cargo ship that sailed from Aqaba with a cargo of phosphate rock and hit Laguna Reef in the Straits of Tiran. | |

== Strait of Malacca ==
| Ship | Flag | Sunk date | Notes | Coordinates |
|---|---|---|---|---|
| Empress of Australia | Australia | 23 August 1992 | A cruise ship that sank in a collision with the Taiwanese fishing vessel Terfu 51. | |
| Galileo Galilei | Bahamas | 21 May 1999 | A cruise ship that sank off the coast of Perak following a fire. | 4°37′1″N 99°54′6″E |
| USS Grenadier | United States Navy | 22 April 1943 | A Tambor-class submarine scuttled off Phuket, Thailand, after Japanese aircraft damaged her the previous day. | 06°30′N 097°40′E |
| Haguro | Imperial Japanese Navy | 16 May 1945 | A Myōkō-class cruiser sunk by British forces 48 nautical miles (89 km; 55 mi) off Penang in the Battle of the Malacca Strait. | |
| I-34 | Imperial Japanese Navy | 13 November 1943 | A Type B1 submarine sunk 30 nautical miles (56 km; 35 mi) off Penang by the British submarine HMS Taurus. | 05°17′N 100°05′E |
| I-166 | Imperial Japanese Navy | 17 July 1944 | A Kaidai 5-type submarine that was sunk by the British submarine HMS Telemachus off One Fathom Bank. | 2°48′N 101°03′E |
| Jenwin | Malaysia | 18 December 1999 | | |
| Kuma | Imperial Japanese Navy | 11 January 1944 | A Kuma-class cruiser that was sunk by the Royal Navy submarine HMS Tally-Ho west of Penang. | 5°26′N 99°52′E |
| Mousquet | French Navy | 28 October 1914 | An Arquebuse-class destroyer sunk by the Imperial German Navy light cruiser SMS Emden at Penang during the Battle of Penang. | |
| Myōkō | Imperial Japanese Navy | 8 June 1946 | A Myōkō-class cruiser that was scuttled near Port Klang. | 3°5′N 100°40′E |
| Nichinan Maru | Imperial Japanese Navy | 19 November 1944 | A cargo ship that was torpedoed by HMS Stratagem 25 miles (40 km) northeast of Bengkalis Islands. | 01°37′N 102°53′E |
| Sovereign of the Seas | United States | 6 August 1859 | A clipper that was wrecked on the Pyramid Shoal. | |
| HMS Stratagem | Royal Navy | 22 November 1944 | A British S-class submarine that was scuttled by her crew after being damaged by depth charges from the Imperial Japanese Navy submarine chaser CH-35. Ten of the crew were captured, three of whom survived. | |
| Takao | Imperial Japanese Navy | 19 October 1946 | A Takao-class heavy cruiser that was surrendered to the British and sunk as a target. | 03°05′05″N 100°41′00″E |
| U-181 | Kriegsmarine | 12 February 1946 | A Type IXD2 U-boat that was scuttled near Port Klang. | 3°05′50″N 100°42′50″E |
| U-859 | Kriegsmarine | 23 September 1944 | A Type IXD2 U-boat that was sunk by HMS Trenchant. | 5.767°N 100.067°E |
| U-862 | Kriegsmarine | 13 February 1946 | A Type IXD2 U-boat that was scuttled near Port Klang. | 3°05′N 100°38′E |
| UIT-23 | Kriegsmarine | 14 February 1944 | A Liuzzi-class submarine, formerly named Reginaldo Giuliani, that was seized by Germany and was torpedoed by the British submarine HMS Tally-Ho northwest of Pangkor Island. | 04°27′N 100°11′E |
| HMS Vestal | Royal Navy | 26 July 1945 | An Algerine-class minesweeper damaged by a kamikaze attack and subsequently scuttled. | 07°05′N 97°50′E |
| Yasushima Maru | Imperial Japanese Navy | March 28, 1944 | A cargo ship for the Imperial Japanese Army that was torpedoed by the HMS Truculent in the Straits of Malacca. | |
| Zhemchug | Imperial Russian Navy | 28 October 1914 | An Izumrud-class protected cruiser sunk by the Imperial German Navy light cruiser SMS Emden at Penang during the Battle of Penang. | |

== Timor Sea ==
| Ship | Flag | Sunk date | Notes | Coordinates |
|---|---|---|---|---|
| I-124 | Imperial Japanese Navy | 27 January 1942 | A Kiraisen-type submarine sunk by Royal Australian Navy and United States Navy ships and aircraft 18 nautical miles (33 km; 21 mi) due south of Penguin Hill on Bathurst Island in Australia's Northern Territory. | 12°07′12.328″S 130°06′23.619″E |
