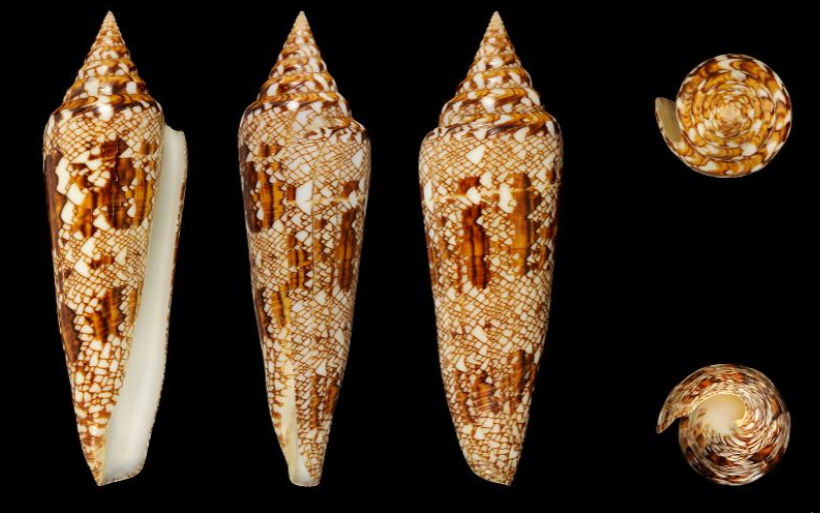
- Shell of Conus bengalensis (specimen at the Smithsonian Institution)

Conservation status
- Least Concern (IUCN 3.1)

Scientific classification
- Kingdom: Animalia
- Phylum: Mollusca
- Class: Gastropoda
- Subclass: Caenogastropoda
- Order: Neogastropoda
- Superfamily: Conoidea
- Family: Conidae
- Genus: Conus
- Species: C. bengalensis

Binomial name
- Conus bengalensis (Okutani, 1968)

Synonyms
- Conus (Cylinder) bengalensis Okutani, 1968 · accepted, alternate representation; Cylinder bengalensis (Okutani, 1968) (synonym: Conus (Cylinder) bengalensis robustus Tove, 2023); Darioconus bengalensis Okutani, 1968 (original description)

= Conus bengalensis =

Species of sea snail

Conus bengalensis, common name the Bengal cone, is a species of sea snail, a marine gastropod mollusk in the family Conidae, the cone snails and their allies.

Like all species within the genus Conus, these snails are predatory and venomous. They are capable of stinging humans, therefore live ones should be handled carefully or not at all.

== Subspecies ==
- Conus bengalensis bengalensis (Okutani, 1968)
- Conus bengalensis robustus Tove, 2023
- Conus bengalensis sumbawaensis (Verbinnen, 2022): synonym of Conus sumbawaensis (Verbinnen, 2022) (superseded rank)

== Description ==
The size of the shell varies between 60 mm and 148 mm.

== Distribution ==
This marine species occurs in deeper waters off the Bay of Bengal, the Andaman Sea, Burma and Thailand.
