= Kadakkarapally Boat =

Shipwreck in Kerala, India

The Kadakkarapally Boat is a shipwreck found near Kadakkarappally, in the Southern India state of Kerala.

The vessel was discovered by farmers in a coconut grove in southern India in 1990. Archaeologists were informed of its existence in 2002, and the wreck was excavated in 2003.

== Dating the wreck ==
Radiocarbon dating conducted in the United States indicated a range of AD 1020 to 1270, which aligns with the C-14 dating results of AD 920 to 1160 from an Indian laboratory. In the absence of associated artifacts for comparative dating, the overlapping radiocarbon dates, specifically 1020 to 1160, are considered the probable period of the vessel's construction.

== Hull ==
The vessel is a flat-bottomed boat with a hard chine, pointed bow and a similar stern. The planking is in two layers held together with iron nails and chunnam. Large floors set in recesses carved into the bottom help give the craft some internal strength, but these are set far apart and probably are only secondary to the ship. Deck beams dovetailed into the vessel's chine strake help hold the side of the ship.

Furthermore, channels and cleats throughout the hull are for transverse lashing, as seen in the presence of rope remains in them as well as in their alignment. This feature has only been found previously on Pharaonic Egyptian boats, such as the Khufu ship dating to the early third millennium B.C. No cultural connection is implied between Egypt and the Kadakkarapally Boat. Some have suggested the cleats and channels are part of a lashed-lug compression system as found in the Western Pacific and some areas of Southeastern Asia. This is not the case here, however, as the hull form is wrong (lashed-lug requires a hull curved in cross-section), and there are no wear marks indicative of such a compression system.

Bulkheads made of panels were set into the tops of the floors to divide the hull into compartments. These were not watertight, as centrally placed limber holes run through the floor for the drainage of the bilge. While the presence of bulkheads invites comparisons with Chinese ships, the ones on the Kadakkarapally Boat are different in that Chinese bulkheads are watertight and thus serve a somewhat different function.
