= Egyptian minesweeper Miniya =

Egyptian Navy minesweeper sunk in 1970

History

Egypt
- Name: Miniya
- Acquired: Transferred from the Soviet Union, 1956–1959
- Identification: Pennant number: 302
- Fate: Sunk by Israeli aircraft at Hurghada, 6 February 1970
- Status: Wreck; recreational dive site

General characteristics (as reported in 1960)
- Class & type: T43-class minesweeper
- Displacement: 410 tons standard; 530 tons full load
- Length: 200 ft (61 m)
- Beam: 27.25 ft (8.31 m)
- Draught: 9 ft (2.7 m)
- Propulsion: Diesel engines
- Speed: 18 kn (33 km/h; 21 mph)
- Armament: 4 × 37 mm anti-aircraft guns

Miniya (reported at the time of her loss as El Minia or El Menia) was a T43-class minesweeper of the Egyptian Navy, one of a group of ships of the class transferred from the Soviet Union from 1956. She was sunk by Israeli aircraft at Hurghada, on the Red Sea coast of Egypt, on 6 February 1970 during the War of Attrition, hours after Egyptian frogmen attacked two Israeli naval vessels at Eilat. Her wreck lies outside Hurghada harbour and is a recreational dive site, known to divers as El Mina or El Minya.

== Description and service ==
Miniya was a Soviet-built fleet minesweeper of the T43 type. The 1960–61 edition of Jane's Fighting Ships listed her with Bahaira, Charkieh and Gharbia among the Egyptian ships of the class, stating that four had been reported transferred from the Soviet Navy and delivered to Egypt in 1956, with two others following later. Conway's All the World's Fighting Ships gives her pennant number as 302 and states that four ships of the class were transferred in 1956–1959.

As reported by Jane's in 1960, ships of the class in Egyptian service displaced 410 tons standard and 530 tons at full load, measured 200 by 27.25 by 9 feet (60.96 by 8.31 by 2.74 m), were armed with four 37 mm anti-aircraft guns and had diesel engines giving a speed of 18 knots (33 km/h; 21 mph).

== Sinking ==
In the early hours of 6 February 1970, Egyptian frogmen attached mines to two Israeli naval vessels in the harbour at Eilat; one, a 500-ton supply vessel, sank within an hour and the other, a smaller landing craft, was beached. Israeli officials reported no casualties. Just before dusk the same day, within fifteen hours of the attack at Eilat, Israeli Air Force aircraft attacked the anchorage at Hurghada and sank Miniya in retaliation. Naval reference works record the loss as having taken place in the Gulf of Suez.

The two sides described the ship differently. Israeli military officials said that she was a 700-ton Soviet-built minelayer of the T43 type with a crew of about 80, armed with two twin 37 mm gun turrets and used in anti-submarine warfare, and that she had been sunk south of Shadwan Island near Hurghada; they gave no report of casualties or survivors. In Cairo, the Middle East News Agency reported that Israeli aircraft had sunk "the 139-ton supply vessel El Minia" during a two-hour attack on the ports of Hurghada and Safaga, and that all members of the crew had been rescued; The New York Times reported the Egyptian description as a 120-ton supply craft, El Menia. Egypt also said that two Israeli Mirage aircraft had been shot down during the attack.

Jane's Fighting Ships later recorded that Miniya "was sunk by Israeli air attack in the Gulf of Suez on 6 Feb 1970 but was later replaced".

== Wreck and dive site ==
The wreck lies just outside the port of Hurghada at a depth of about 30 metres (98 ft). It is a recreational dive site, known to divers as El Mina, the "Harbour Wreck", or El Minya. The stern is twisted to port with the deck facing the seabed, and the minesweeping gear, winches and anchor chain remain in place. The anti-aircraft guns are still mounted, and the interior can be entered.

The wreck in February 2012

Encrusted spoked wheel on the wreck

Domed fitting in a recess of the superstructure

A diver beneath the overhanging hull

A coral grouper among glassfish under the wreckage

== See also ==
- List of shipwrecks in 1970
- List of shipwrecks in the Indian Ocean
