= Bay of Bengal =

Northeastern part of the Indian Ocean

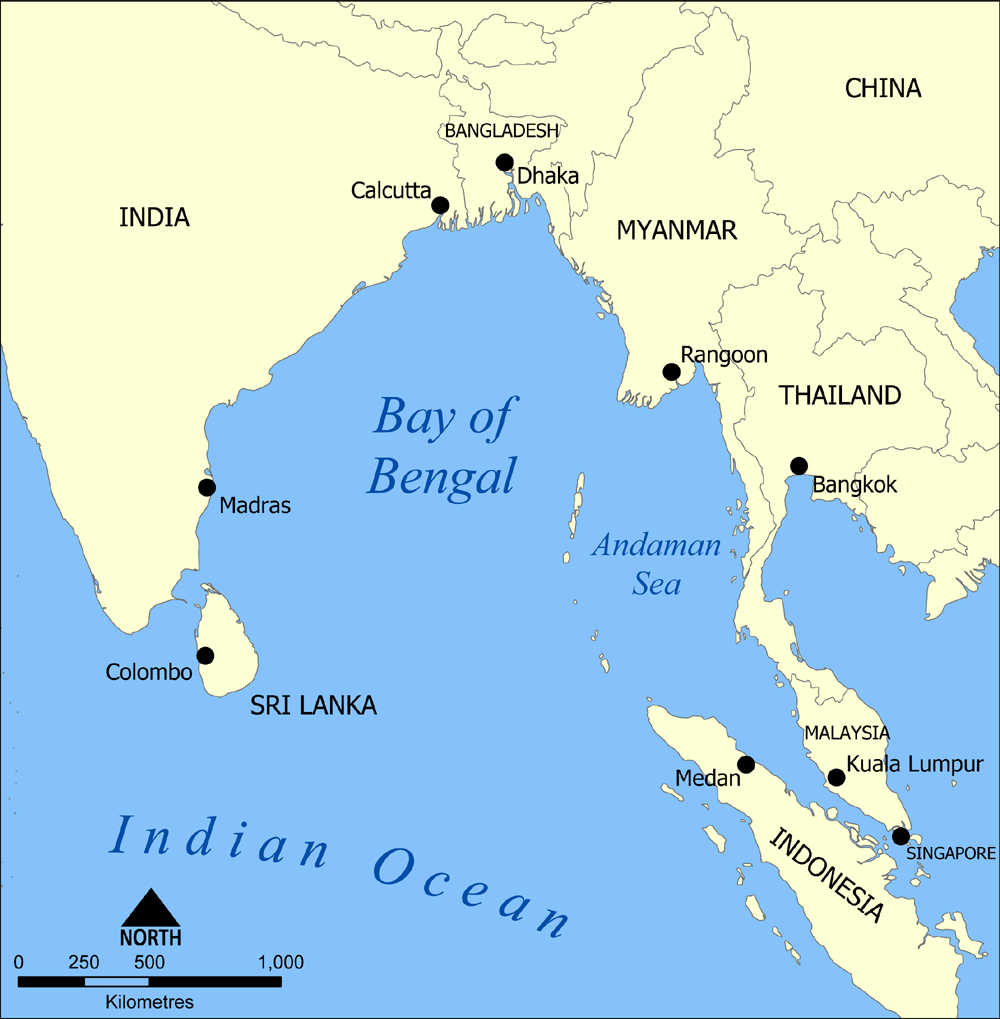
- A map of the Bay of Bengal
- Interactive map of Bay of Bengal
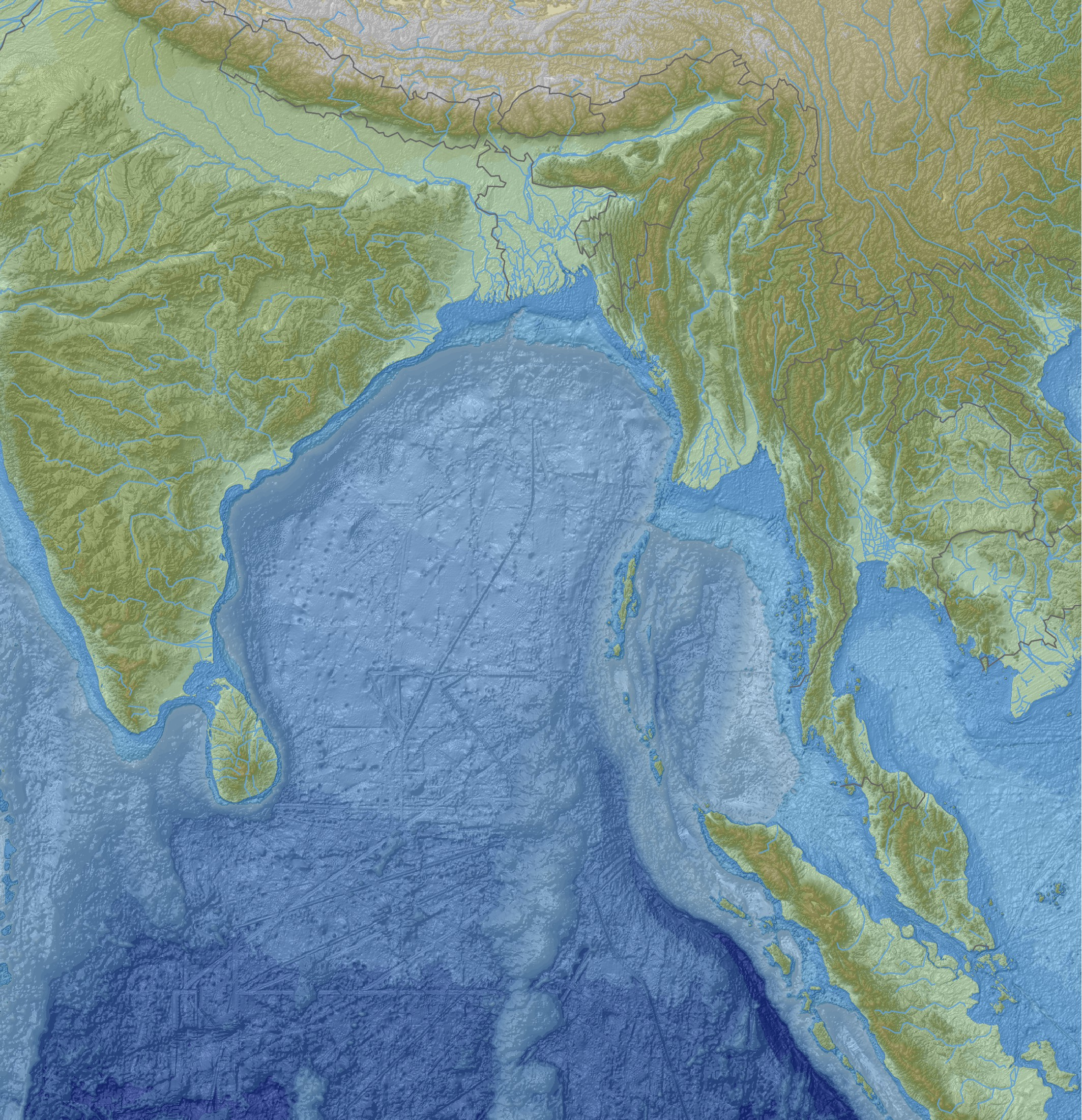
- Relief map of the Bay of Bengal
- Location: South Asia and Southeast Asia
- Coordinates: 15°N 88°E
- Type: Bay
- Primary inflows: Indian Ocean
- Basin countries: Bangladesh; India; Indonesia; Myanmar; Sri Lanka; Thailand
- Max. length: 2,090 km (1,300 mi)
- Max. width: 1,610 km (1,000 mi)
- Surface area: 2,600,000 km^{2} (1,000,000 sq mi)
- Average depth: 2,600 m (8,500 ft)
- Max. depth: 4,694 m (15,400 ft)
- References: World Atlas, The Asiatic Society, Asiatic Society of Bangladesh

The Bay of Bengal forms the northeastern part of the Indian Ocean, located between the Indian subcontinent and the Indochinese peninsula, south of the Bengal region. Spread across an area of 2,600,000 km^{2} (1,000,000 sq mi), it is bordered by many of the countries in South Asia and Southeast Asia.

Geopolitically, the bay is bound by mainland India on the west and northwest, Bangladesh in the north, Myanmar in the northeast and the Andaman and Nicobar Islands of India in the east. Its southern limit is a line between Sangaman Kanda in Sri Lanka, and the northwesternmost point of Sumatra in Indonesia.

Major river systems of the Indian subcontinent such as the Ganges, Brahmaputra, Irrawaddy, Godavari, Krishna, Brahmani, Baitarani, Rushikulya, Mahanadi, and Kaveri flow into the Bay of Bengal. The coast consist of many beaches including some of the world's longest natural beaches, such as Cox's Bazar and Marina, and varied ecosytems such as the Sundarbans, the largest mangrove forest in the world.

== Background ==
=== Extent ===
The International Hydrographic Organization defines the limits of the Bay of Bengal as follows:

On the east: A line running from Cape Negrais (16°03'N) in Burma through the larger islands of the Andaman group, in such a way that all the narrow waters between the islands lie Eastward of the line and are excluded from the Bay of Bengal, as far as a point in Little Andaman Island in latitude 10°48'N, longitude 92°24'E and thence along the Southwest limit of the Burma Sea [A line running from "Oedjong Raja" ["Ujung Raja" or "Point Raja"] (5°32′N 95°12′E) in Sumatra to Poeloe Bras (Breuëh) and on through the Western Islands of the Nicobar Group to Sandy Point in Little Andaman Island, in such a way that all the narrow waters appertain to the Burma Sea].

On the south: Adam's Bridge (between India and Ceylon) and from the Southern extreme of Dondra Head (South point of Ceylon) to the North point of Poeloe Bras (5°44′N 95°04′E).

Note: Oedjong means "cape" in Dutch on maps of the Netherlands East Indies (Indonesia).

=== Etymology ===
The bay gets its name from the historical Bengal region (modern-day Bangladesh and the Indian states of West Bengal, Tripura and the Barak Valley of Southern Assam). In Ancient Indian scriptures, this water body may have been referred to as Mahodadhi. Ancient Romans called it Sinus Gangeticus or Gangeticus Sinus whilst Ancient Greeks called it in Ancient Greek: Κόλπος Γαγγητικός, meaning "Gulf of the Ganges", and old European maps continued to use this name.

=== History ===
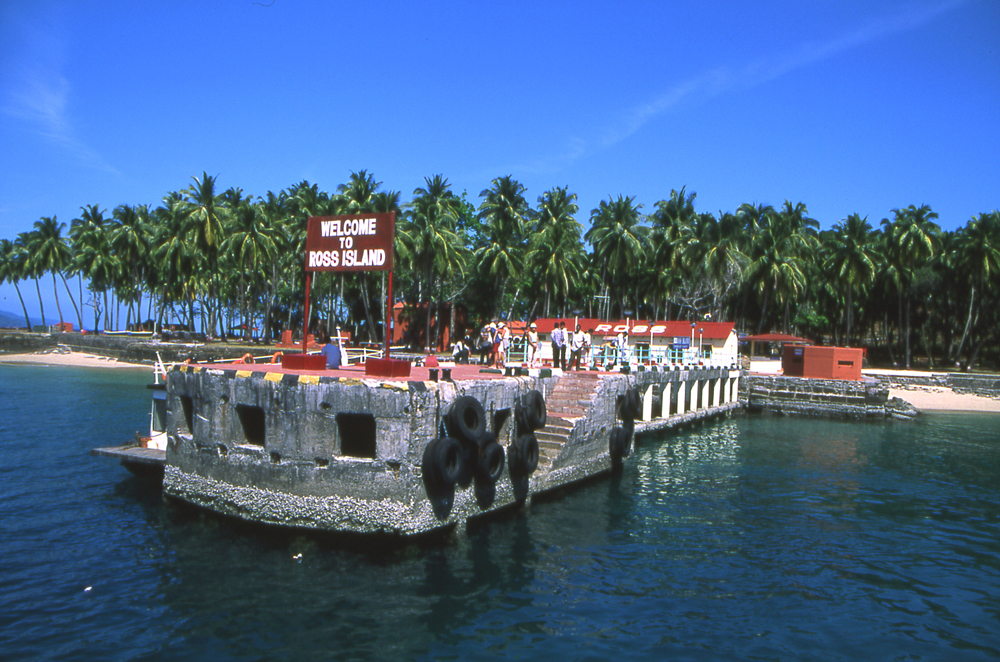
Ross Island, in the Andamans, was one of the main naval bases of India during World War II.

The Bay of Bengal was historically known by several names reflecting the significant maritime kingdoms that bordered it. In the region corresponding to modern Odisha and parts of Andhra Pradesh, it was widely referred to as Kalinga Sagar (Kalinga Sea), derived from the ancient kingdom of Kalinga.

In ancient Classical India, the Bay of Bengal was known as Vaṅgasāgara (Vanga Sea). Another name used mainly in ancient Tamil literature was Vanga Kadal (Vanga Sea or Ocean).

Northern Circars occupied the western coast of the Bay of Bengal and is now considered to be India's Odisha and Andhra Pradesh state. Chola dynasty (9th century to 12th century) when ruled by Rajaraja Chola I and Rajendra Chola I occupied and controlled the Bay of Bengal with Chola Navy circa AD 1014, the Bay of Bengal was also called the Chola Sea or Chola Lake.

The Kakatiya dynasty reached the western coastline of the Bay of Bengal between the Godavari and the Krishna River. Kushanas about the middle of the 1st century AD invaded northern India perhaps extending as far as the Bay of Bengal. Chandragupta Maurya extended the Maurya Dynasty across northern India to the Bay of Bengal. Hajipur was a stronghold for Portuguese Pirates. In the 16th century, the Portuguese built trading posts in the north of the Bay of Bengal at Chittagong (Porto Grande) and Satgaon (Porto Pequeno).

The earliest sign of Muslims in the region came from the textile trade routes where one targeted the east Arabian Sea influencing migration of Arabs and Persians and another to the west causing Buddhist Bengalis to culturally mix with Islam.

==== Historic sites ====
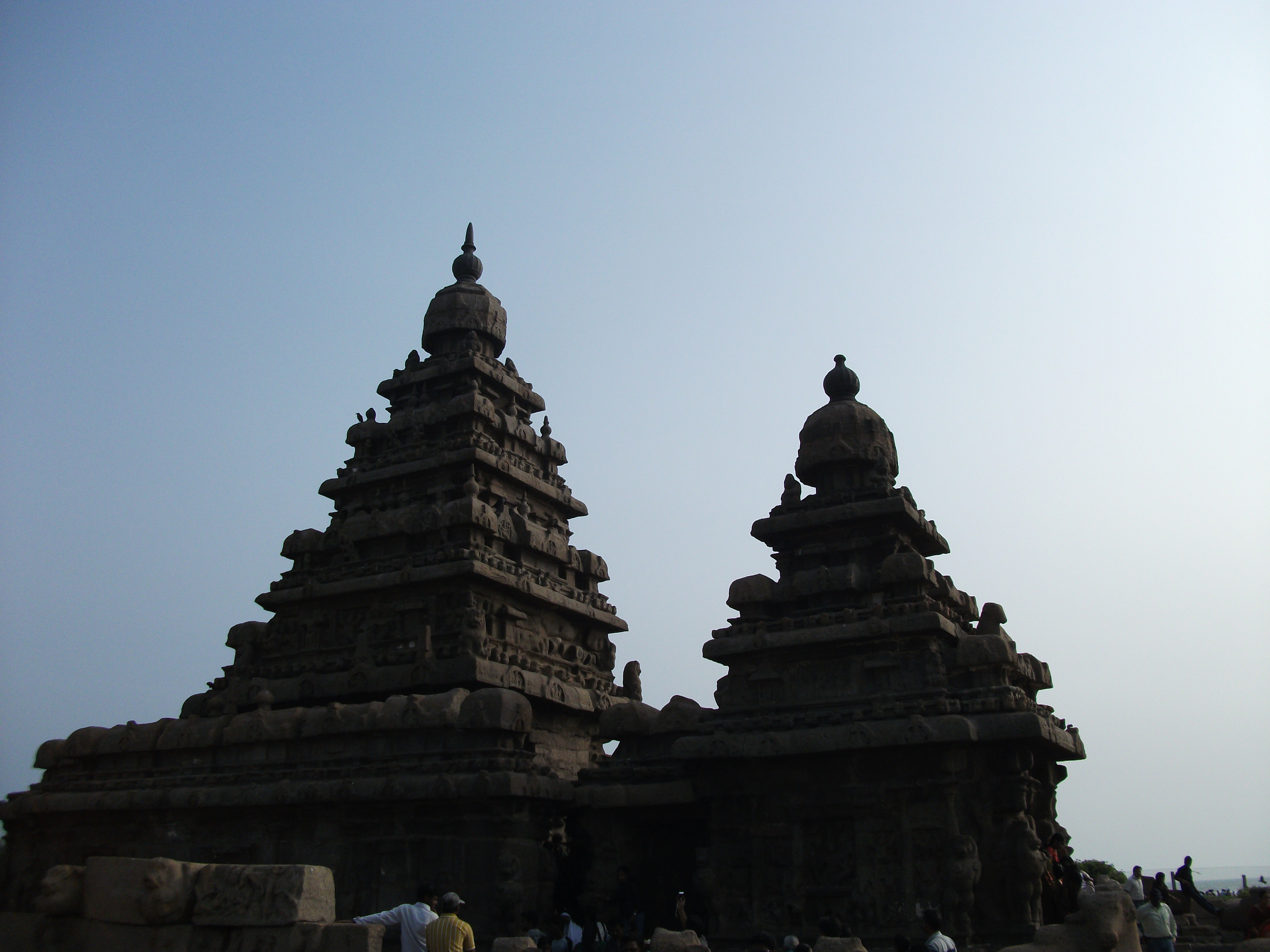
The Shore Temple, a UNESCO World Heritage Site on the shore of the Bay of Bengal

In alphabetical order:

- Antarvedi is a popular place of worship Southern India, in Konaseema district of Andhra Pradesh devoted to Sri Lakshmi Narasimha Swamy Temple. This is the place where one of the distributaries of Godavari River meets the Bay of Bengal.
- Arikamedu is an archaeological site in Southern India, in Kakkayanthope, Ariyankuppam Commune, Puducherry. It is 4 kilometres (2.5 mi) from the capital, Pondicherry of the Indian territory of Puducherry
- British penal colony: Cellular Jail or "Black Waters" built in 1896 on Ross Island, a part of the Andaman Island Chain. As early as 1858, this island was used as a British penal colony for political prisoners facing life imprisonment.
- Buddhist heritage sites of Pavurallakonda, Thotlakonda and Bavikonda lie along the coast of Bay of Bengal at Visakhapatnam in India.
- Konark is the home of the Sun Temple or Black Pagoda. This Brahman sanctuary was built of black granite mid-1200 AD and has been declared a World Heritage Site.
- Jagannath Temple at Puri is one of the four sacred places in Hindu pilgrimage along with Puri beach on the banks of Bay of Bengal. Mahodadhi was named after Lord Jagannath.
- Ramanathaswamy Temple is at Dhanushkodi, where the Bay of Bengal and the Gulf of Mannar come together.
- Seven Pagodas of Mahabalipuram is the name for Mahabalipuram. Mahabalipuram's Shore Temple, a World Heritage Site was constructed in the 8th century AD and myth has it that six other temples were built here.
- Sri Vaisakheswara Swamy temple lies two kilometers from the Visakhapatnam coast under the Bay of Bengal's sea bed. Spokespeople from Andhra University Centre for Marine Archaeology say the temple may be opposite the Coastal Battery.
- Vivekanandar Illam was constructed in 1842 by the American "Ice King" Frederic Tudor to store and market ice year round. In 1897, Swami Vivekananda's famous lectures were recorded here at Castle Kernan. The site is an exhibition devoted to Swami Vivekananda and his legacy.

==== Marine archaeology ====
Maritime archaeology or marine archaeology is the study of how ancient peoples interacted with the sea and waterways. A specialized branch, archaeology of shipwrecks, studies the salvaged artifacts of ancient ships. Stone anchors, amphorae shards, elephant tusks, hippopotamus teeth, ceramic pottery, a rare wood mast and lead ingots are examples which may survive submerged for centuries for archaeologists to discover, study, and place their salvaged findings into the timeline of history. Coral reefs, tsunamis, cyclones, mangrove swamps, battles, and a criss-cross of sea routes in a high trading area combined with piracy have all contributed to shipwrecks in the Bay of Bengal.

==== Shipwrecks and important shipping incidences ====
In chronological order:

- 1778 to 1783: The Naval operations in the American Revolutionary War or American War of Independence ranged as far as the Bay of Bengal.
- c. 1816: Mornington ship burned in the Bay of Bengal.
- 1850: American clipper brig Eagle is supposed to have sunk in the Bay of Bengal.
- American Baptist missionary Adoniram Judson died 12 April 1850 and was buried at sea in the Bay of Bengal.
- 1855: The Bark "Incredible" struck on a sunken rock in the Bay of Bengal.
- 1865: a gale dismasted the Euterpe while traversing the Bay of Bengal typhoon.
- 1875: Veleda - 76 m (250 ft) long and 15 m (50 ft) wide. It is part of a current salvage operation.
- 1914: September 10 - SS Indus: A steamship that was captured and scuttled by SMS Emden.
- 1942: Japanese cruiser Yura of the Second Expeditionary Fleet, Malay Force, attacked merchant ships in the Bay of Bengal.
  - April 7 - SS Selma City: Attacked by Japanese bombers in the Bay of Bengal, about 25 miles (40 km) offshore from Vizagapatam, India.
  - April 9 - HMS Hermes: The world's first purpose-built aircraft carrier, which sunk after receiving 40 direct hits from 70 Mitsubishi A6M Zero fighter/bombers off the coast of Sri Lanka.
- 1971: December 3 – Pakistan Navy submarine PNS Ghazi sunk under mysterious circumstances, near Visakhapatnam, in the Bay of Bengal.

== Significance ==
=== Economic importance ===
One of the first trading ventures along the Bay of Bengal was The Company of Merchants of London Trading into the East Indies, more commonly referred to as the British East India Company. Gopalpur-on-Sea was one of their main trading centers. Other trading companies along the Bay of Bengal shorelines were the English East India Company and the French East India Company.

BIMSTEC (Bay of Bengal Initiative for Multi-Sectoral Technical and Economic Cooperation) supports free trade internationally around the Bay of Bengal between Bangladesh, Bhutan, India, Myanmar, Nepal, Sri Lanka, and Thailand.

The Sethusamudram Shipping Canal Project is a new venture proposed which would create a channel for a shipping route to link the Gulf of Mannar with the Bay of Bengal. This would connect India from east to west without the necessity of going around Sri Lanka.

Thoni and catamaran fishing boats of fishing villages thrive along the Bay of Bengal shorelines. Fishermen can catch between 26 and 44 species of marine fish. In one year, the average catch is two million tons of fish from the Bay of Bengal alone. Approximately 31% of the world's coastal fishermen live and work on the bay.

=== Geostrategic importance ===
The Bay of Bengal is centrally located in South and Southeast Asia. It lies at the center of two huge economic blocks, the SAARC and ASEAN. It influences China's southern landlocked region in the north and major sea ports of Bangladesh and India. China, India, and Bangladesh have forged naval cooperation agreements with Malaysia, Thailand, and Indonesia to increase cooperation in checking terrorism in the high seas. The Bay of Bengal's connection of South Asia to East Asia has aided in Bangladesh's efficiency of distributing natural gas to the Asia Pacific.

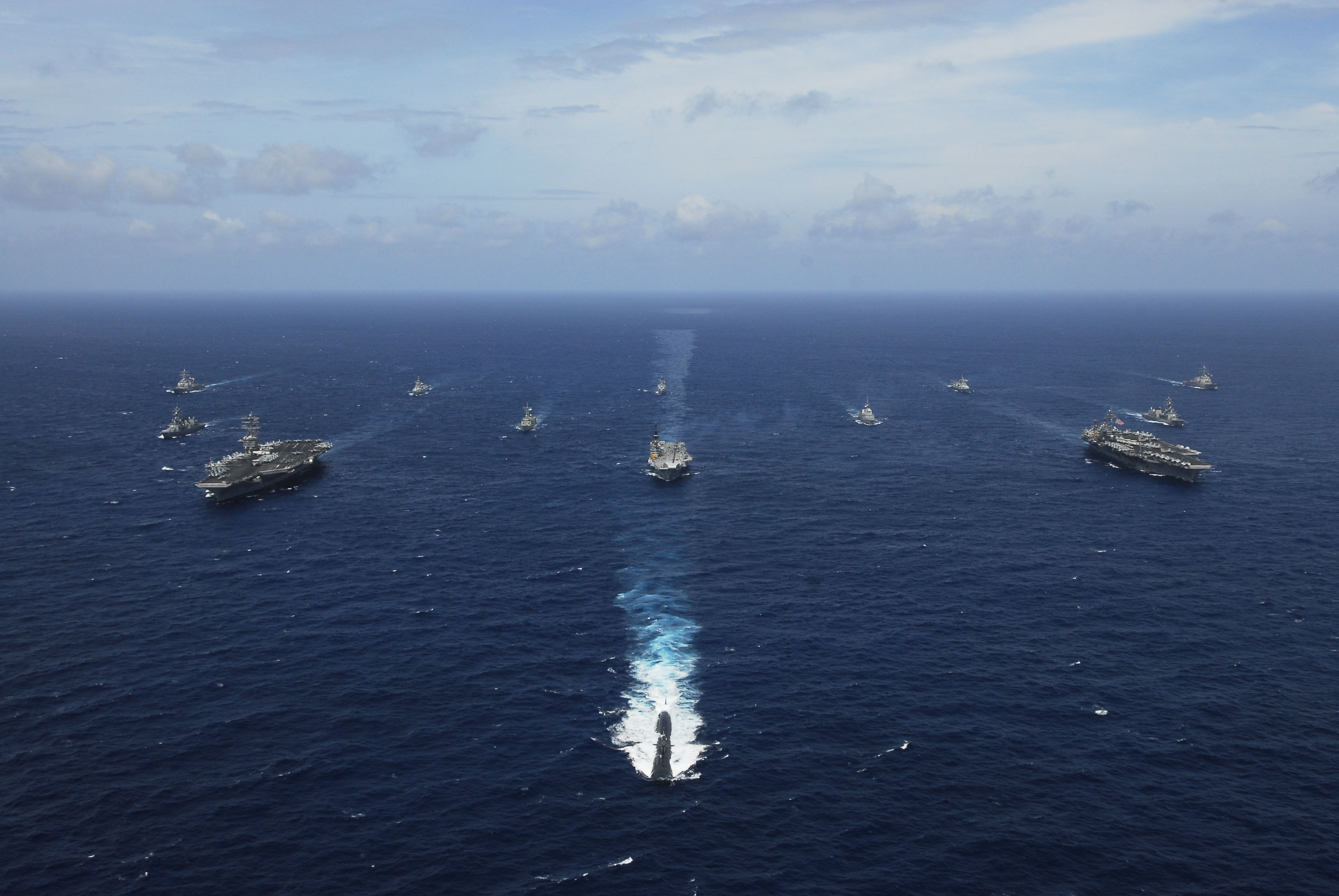
Image of United States ships participating in the Malabar 2007 naval exercise. Aegis cruisers from the navies of Japan and Australia, and logistical support ships from Singapore and India in the Bay of Bengal took part.

Its outlying islands (the Andaman and Nicobar Islands) and, most importantly, major ports such as Chittagong, Mongla, Payra, Paradip, Kolkata, Chennai, Visakhapatnam, and Tuticorin, along its coast with the Bay of Bengal added to its importance.

China has made efforts to project influence into the region through tie-ups with Myanmar and Bangladesh. The United States has held major exercises with Bangladesh, Malaysia, Singapore, Thailand and recently India. The largest ever wargame in Bay of Bengal, known as Malabar 2007, was held in 2007 and naval warships from the United States, India, Singapore, Japan and Australia took part.

Large deposits of natural gas in the areas within Bangladesh's sea zone incited a serious urgency by India and Myanmar into a territorial dispute. Disputes over rights of some oil and gas blocks have caused brief diplomatic spats between Myanmar and India with Bangladesh.

The disputed maritime boundary between Bangladesh and Myanmar resulted in military tensions in 2008 and 2009. The maritime dispute between Bangladesh and Myanmar settled in 2012 through the judgement of ITLOS. In 2014, the dispute between India and Bangladesh was also settled in which the UN tribunal awarded Bangladesh 19,467 km^{2} of the 25,602 km^{2} sea area of the Bay of Bengal.

=== Religious importance ===
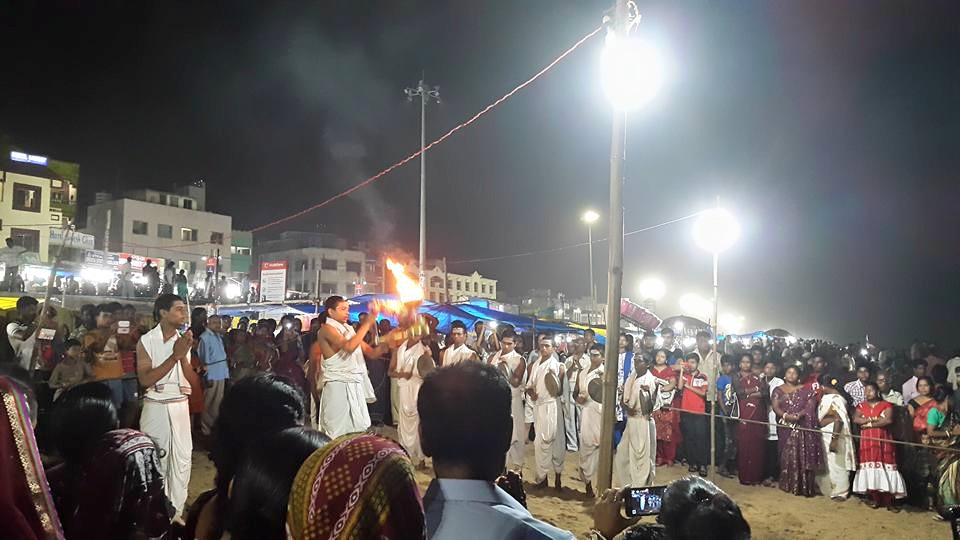
Samudra arati or worship of the sea by disciples of the Govardhan Matha at Puri

The Bay of Bengal in the stretch of Swargadwar, the gateway to heaven in Sanskrit, in the Indian town of Puri is considered holy by Hindus.

The Samudra arati is a daily tradition started by the present Shankaracharya of Puri 9 years ago to honour the sacred sea. The daily practise includes prayer and fire offering to the sea at Swargadwar in Puri by disciples of the Govardhana matha of the Shankaracharya. On Paush Purnima of every year the Shankaracharya himself comes out to offer prayers to the sea.

== Key features ==
=== Beaches ===
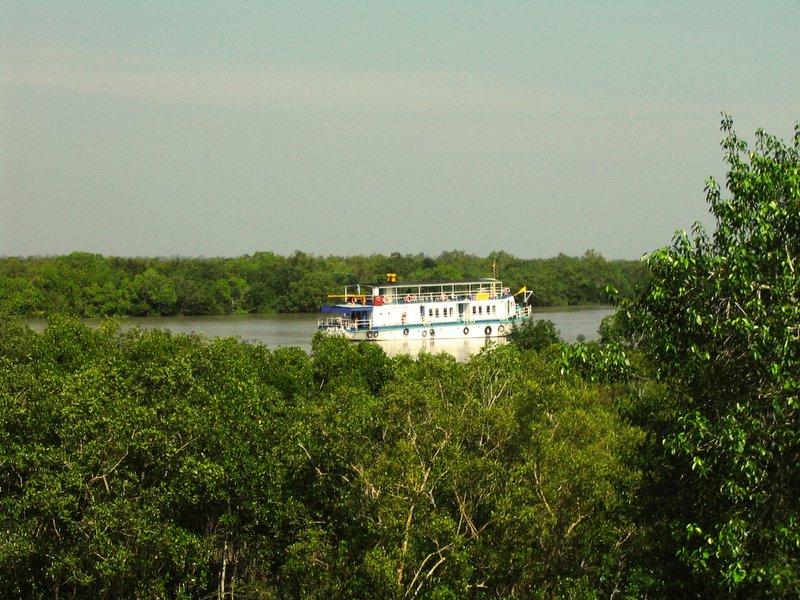
The Sunderbans bordering the Bay of Bengal is the largest single block of tidal halophytic mangrove forest in the world.

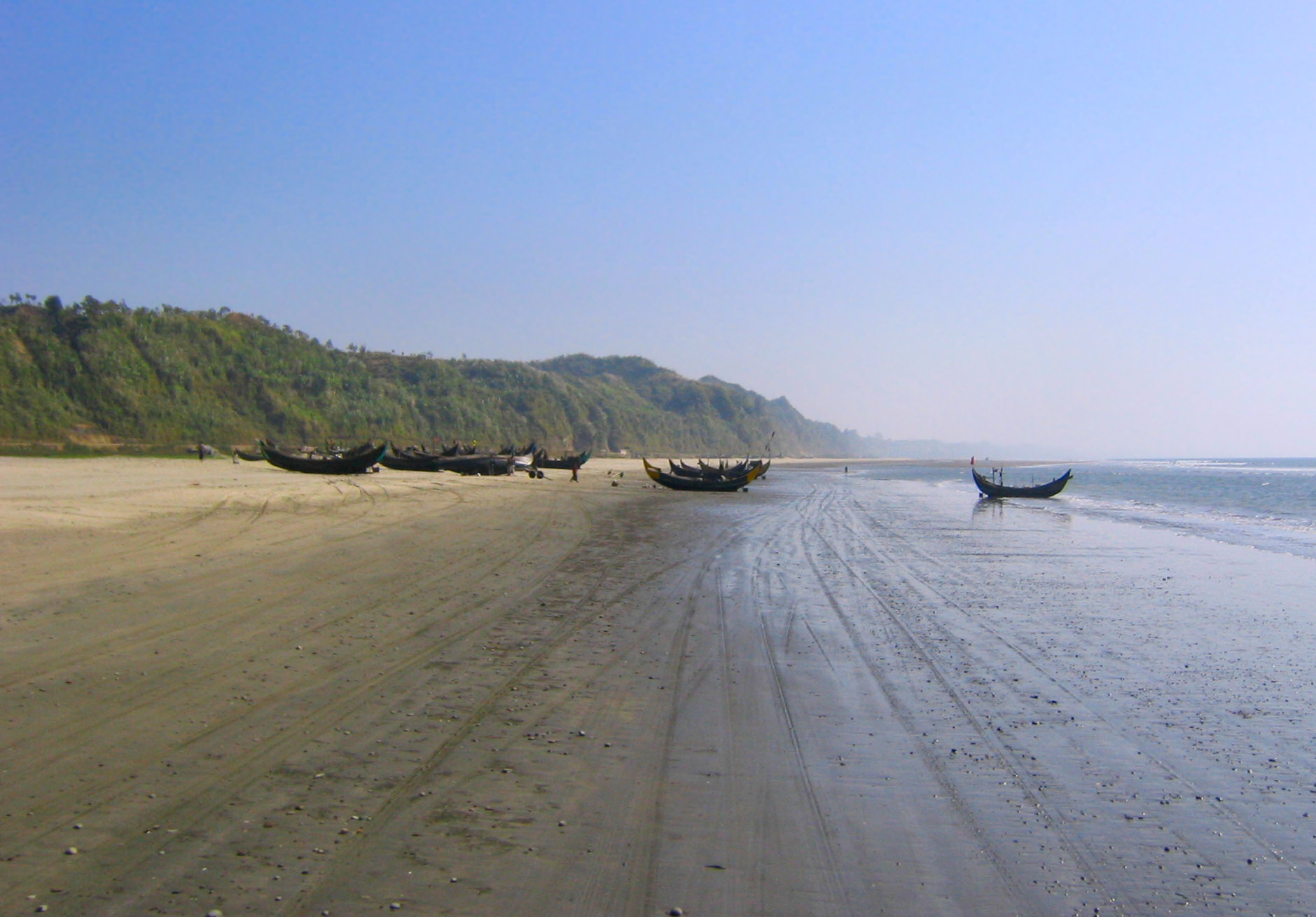
Cox's Bazar, the longest stretch of beach in the world

Sea Beach	Location
Cox's Bazar, Chittagong	Bangladesh
Kuakata, Barishal	Bangladesh
St. Martin's Island	Bangladesh
Sonadia, Chittagong	Bangladesh
Nijhum Dwip, Noakhali	Bangladesh
Inani Beach, Chittagong	Bangladesh
Teknaf, Chittagong	Bangladesh
Patenga, Chittagong	Bangladesh
Bakkhali, West Bengal	India
Digha, West Bengal	India
Mandarmoni, West Bengal	India
Tajpur, West Bengal	India
Shankarpur, West Bengal	India
Talasari, Odisha	India
Chandipur, Odisha	India
Gahirmatha Beach, Odisha	India
Astaranga, Odisha	India
Chandrabhaga Beach, Konark, Odisha	India
Puri, Odisha	India
Gopalpur, Odisha	India
Baruva, Andhra Pradesh	India
Bheemili, Andhra Pradesh	India
RK Beach, Visakhapatnam	India
Rushikonda, Visakhapatnam	India
Yarada, Visakhapatnam	India
Perupalem Beach	India
Manginapudi Beach, Machilipatnam, Andhra Pradesh	India
Mypadu Beach, Nellore, Andhra Pradesh	India
Marina Beach, Chennai, Tamil Nadu	India
Edward Elliot's Beach, Chennai, Tamil Nadu	India
Mahabalipuram, Tamil Nadu	India
Nagapattinam, Tamil Nadu	India
Silver Beach, Cuddalore, Tamil Nadu	India
Tuticorin Beach, Tamil Nadu	India
Rameswaram Beach, Tamil Nadu	India
Velankanni Beach, Tamil Nadu	India
Serenity Beach, Pondicherry	India
Promenade Beach, Pondicherry	India
Radhanagar Beach, Andaman & Nicobar Islands	India
Ulee Lheue beach	Indonesia
Alur Nunang Beach	Indonesia
Ngapali	Myanmar
Ngwesaung	Myanmar
Chaungtha, Pathein	Myanmar
Sittwe	Myanmar
Casuarina Beach, Jaffna	Sri Lanka
Trincomalee	Sri Lanka
Navaladi Beach, Batticaloa	Sri Lanka

=== Channels ===
Channels, Passages, and Straits in the Bay of Bengal
Name	Jurisdiction	Depth (m)	Breadth (m)	Location and Comments	Citation
Alexandra Channel	Myanmar	Navigable for large vessels (generally deep)	~10,000	Separates Great Coco Island from Little Coco Island.	
Coco Channel	Myanmar (north), India (south)	Navigable for various vessels	~18,000	Separates Coco Islands (Myanmar) from Landfall Island and North Andaman Island (India).	
Cleugh Passage	India	Navigable	~5,000	Separates Landfall Island and East Island from North Andaman Island.	
Austin Strait	India	Limited navigability for larger vessels	Narrow	Separates North Andaman Island from Middle Andaman Island.	
Interview Passage	India	Navigable for smaller vessels	Very narrow	Separates Interview Island from Middle Andaman Island, off the west coast.	
Homfray's Strait	India	Navigable	Varies	Separates Middle Andaman Island from Baratang Island and northern South Andaman Island; Elphinstone Harbour is located here.	
Diligent Strait	India	Navigable (wide and safe)	Wide	Separates Ritchie's Archipelago from Baratang Island and South Andaman Island.	
Middle (or Andaman) Strait	India	Limited navigability for larger vessels	Narrow	Separates Baratang Island from South Andaman Island.	
Kwangtung Strait	India	Navigable	Narrow	Intersects Ritchie's Archipelago.	
Fusilier Channel	India	Navigable	Not specified	Located to the south of Neil Island (Shaheed Dweep) in Ritchie's Archipelago.	
Macpherson Strait	India	Navigable by ocean-going vessels	Not specified	Separates South Andaman Island from Rutland Island.	
Manners Strait	India	Navigable (main commercial highway)	Not specified	Lies within Duncan Passage, separating Cinque Islands from Rutland Island.	
Duncan Passage	India	Navigable	~48,000	Separates Rutland Island (Andaman Islands) from Little Andaman Island.	
Ten Degree Channel	India	Min. 7.3	~150,000	Separates the Andaman Islands from the Nicobar Islands; a major international shipping route.	
Revelto Channel	India	Navigable	Not specified	Located within the Nicobar Islands, separating Little Nicobar Island from Great Nicobar Island.	
Sombrero Channel	India	Navigable	~50,000	Separates Little Nicobar Island and Southern Group from Central Group of Nicobar Islands.	
Saint George's Channel	India	Navigable	Not specified	Separates Great Nicobar Island from Little Nicobar Island.	
Great Channel	India (north), Indonesia (south)	Very deep (major international shipping lane)	~163,000	Separates Great Nicobar Island (India) from Sumatra (Indonesia); also known as the Six Degree Channel.	
Palk Strait	India (west), Sri Lanka (east)	Max. 35	~64,000 to 137,000	Connects Palk Bay (part of Bay of Bengal) with the Gulf of Mannar; contains Adam's Bridge, limiting large ship transit.	

=== Islands ===
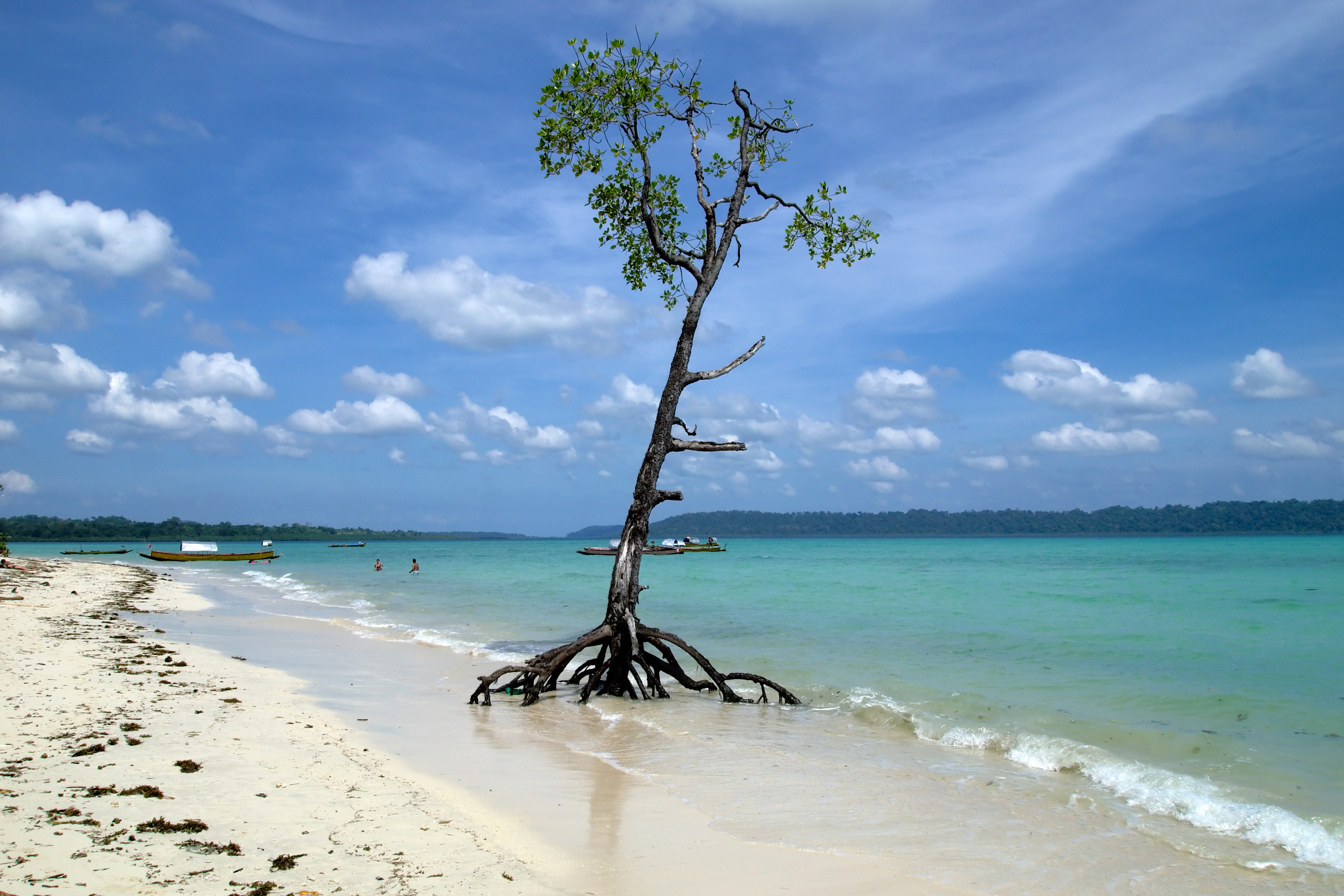
Havelock Island, Andaman Islands

The islands in the bay are numerous, including the Andaman Islands and Nicobar Islands of India. The Cheduba group of islands, in the north-east, off the Burmese coast, are remarkable for a chain of mud volcanoes, which are occasionally active.

Great Andaman is the main archipelago or island group of the Andaman Islands, whereas Ritchie's Archipelago consists of smaller islands. Only 37, or 6.5%, of the 572 islands and islets of the Andaman and Nicobar Islands are inhabited.

=== Rivers ===
Many major rivers of India and Bangladesh flow west to east before draining into the Bay of Bengal. The Ganga is the northernmost of these rivers. Its main channel enters and flows through Bangladesh, where it is known as the Padma River, before joining the Meghna River. However, the Brahmaputra River flows from east to west in Assam before turning south and entering Bangladesh where it is called the Jamuna River. This joins the Padma whereupon the Padma joins the Meghna River that finally drains into Bay of Bengal. The Sundarbans is a mangrove forest in the southern part of the Ganges-Brahmaputra Delta which lies in the Indian state of West Bengal and in Bangladesh. The Brahmaputra at 2,948 km (1,832 mi) is the 15th longest River in the world. It originates in Tibet. The Hooghly River, another channel of the Ganga that flows through Kolkata drains into Bay of Bengal at Sagar in West Bengal, India.

The Ganga–Brahmaputra-Barak rivers deposit nearly 1000 million tons of sediment every year. The sediment from these three rivers form the Bengal Delta and the submarine fan, a vast structure that extends from Bengal to south of the Equator, is up to 16.5 kilometres (10.3 mi) thick, and contains at least 1,130 trillion tonnes of sediment, which has accumulated over the last 17 million years at an average rate of 665 million tons per annum. The fan has buried organic carbon at a rate of nearly 1.1 trillion mol/yr (13.2 million t/yr) since the early Miocene period. The three rivers currently contribute nearly 8% of the total organic carbon (TOC) deposited in the world's oceans. Due to high TOC accumulation in the deep sea bed of the Bay of Bengal, the area is rich in oil and natural gas and gas hydrate reserves. Bangladesh can reclaim land substantially and economically gain from the sea area by constructing sea dikes, bunds, causeways and by trapping the sediment from its rivers.

Further southwest of Bengal, the Mahanadi, Godavari, Krishna and Kaveri Rivers also flow from west to east across Deccan Plateau in Peninsular India and drain into the Bay of Bengal forming deltas. Many small rivers also drain directly into the Bay of Bengal forming estuaries; the shortest of them is the Cooum River at 64 km (40 mi).

While Myanmar's Irrawaddy River flows into the Andaman Sea, sediment from the river is found in the eastern Bay of Bengal.

=== Seaports ===
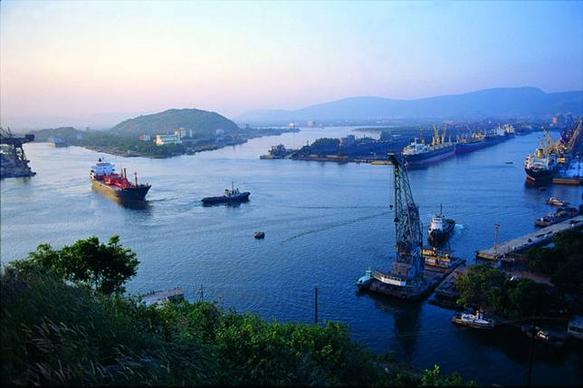
The city of Visakhapatnam in India is a major port of the Bay of Bengal.

Indian ports on the bay include Paradip Port, Kolkata Port, Haldia Port, Chennai Port, Visakhapatnam Port, Kakinada Port, Pondicherry Port, Dhamra Port, and Gopalpur-on-Sea. Bangladeshi ports on the Bay are Chittagong, Mongla, Payra Port. Sri Lankan ports include Jaffna, Kankesanthurai, Batticaloa, and Trincomalee. Myanmar's main sea port includes Akyab (Sittwe).

== Oceanography ==
=== Geology ===
==== Lithosphere and plate tectonics ====
The lithosphere of the earth is broken up into what are called tectonic plates. Underneath the Bay of Bengal, which is part of the great Indo-Australian Plate and is slowly moving north east. This plate meets the Burma Microplate at the Sunda Trench. The Nicobar Islands and the Andaman Islands are part of the Burma Microplate. The India Plate subducts beneath the Burma Plate at the Sunda Trench or Java Trench. Here, the pressure of the two plates on each other increase pressure and temperature resulting in the formation of volcanoes such as the volcanoes in Myanmar, and a volcanic arc called the Sunda Arc. The Sumatra-Andaman earthquake and Asian tsunami was a result of the pressure at this zone causing a submarine earthquake which then resulted in a destructive tsunami.

==== Marine geology ====
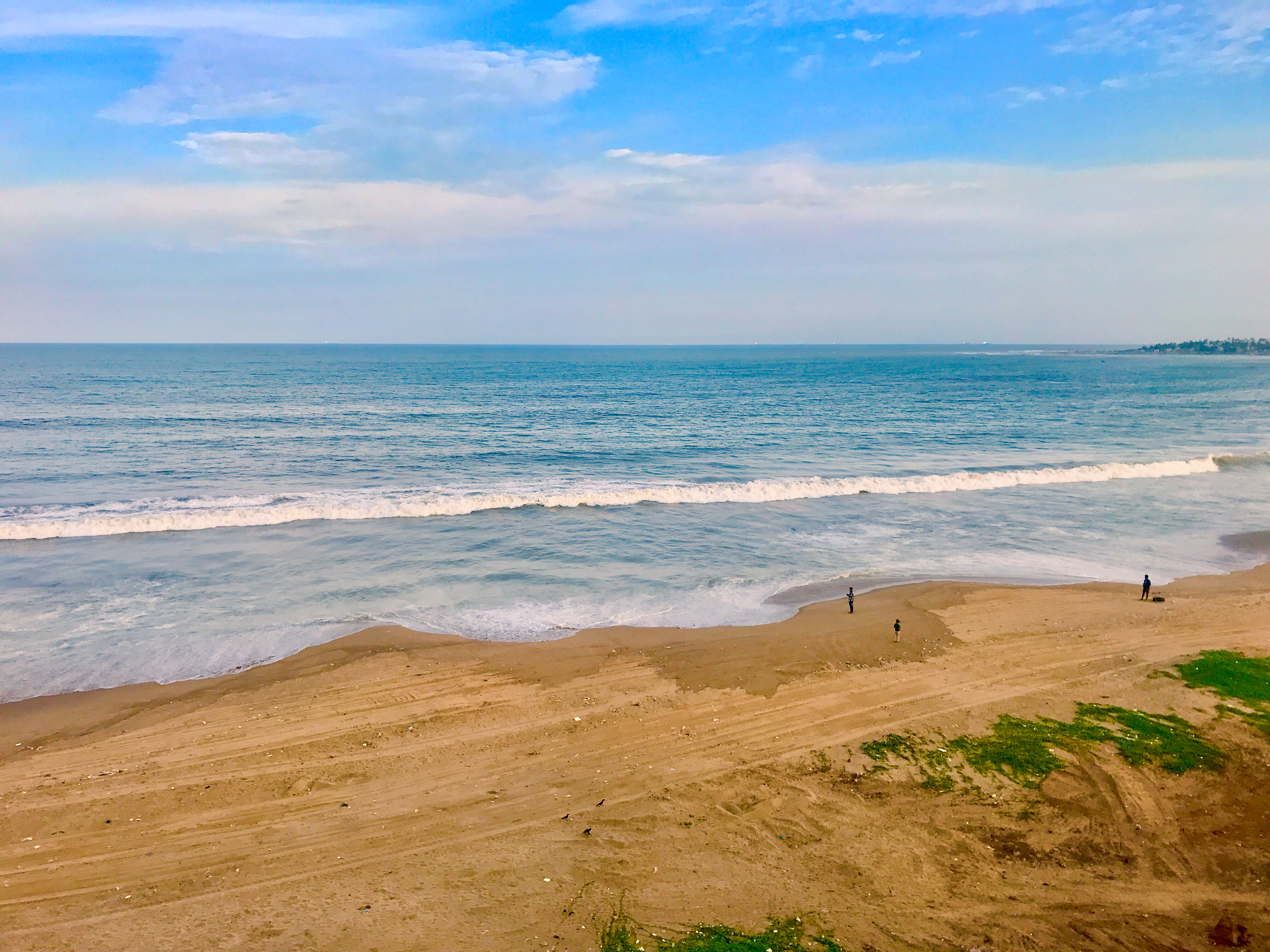
Bay of Bengal near Tenneti Park, Visakhapatnam

A zone 50 m wide extending from the island of Sri Lanka and the Coromandel coast to the head of the bay, and thence southwards through a strip embracing the Andaman and Nicobar islands, is bounded by the 100 fathom line of sea bottom; some 50 m. beyond this lies the 500-fathom limit. Opposite the mouth of the Ganges, however, the intervals between these depths are very much extended by deltaic influence.

Swatch of No Ground is a 14 km-wide deep sea canyon of the Bay of Bengal. The deepest recorded area of this valley is about 1340 m. The submarine canyon is part of the Bengal Fan, the largest submarine fan in the world.

==== Submarine fans ====
Submarine fan is also known as abyssal fan. Bay of Bengal fan, known as Bengal Fan, also known as the Ganges Fan is world's largest abyssal fan, also known as deep-sea fans, underwater deltas, and submarine fans. The fan is about 3,000 km (1,900 mi) long, 1,430 km (890 mi) wide with a maximum thickness of 16.5 km (10.3 mi). The fan resulted from the uplift and erosion of the Himalayas and the Tibetan Plateau produced by the collision between the Indian Plate and the Eurasian Plate. Most of the sediment is supplied by the Ganges and Brahmaputra rivers which supply the Lower Meghna delta in Bangladesh and the Hoogly delta in West Bengal (India). Several other large rivers in Bangladesh and India provide smaller contributions. Turbidity currents have transported the sediment through a series of submarine canyons, some of which are more than 2,400 kilometres (1,500 mi) in length, to be deposited in the Bay of Bengal up to 30 degrees latitude from where it began. To date, the oldest sediments recovered from the Bengal fan are from Early Miocene age. Their mineralogical and geochemical characteristics allow to identify their Himalayan origin and demonstrate that the Himalaya was already a major mountain range 20 million years ago.

The fan completely covers the floor of the Bay of Bengal. It is bordered to the west by the continental slope of eastern India, to the north by the continental slope of Bangladesh and to east by the northern part of Sunda Trench off Myanmar and the Andaman Islands, the accretionary wedge associated with subduction of the Indo-Australian Plate beneath the Sunda Plate and continues along the west side of the Ninety East Ridge. The Nicobar Fan, another lobe of the fan, lies east of the Ninety East Ridge.

The fan is now being explored as a possible source of fossil fuels for the surrounding developing nations.

The fan was first identified by bathymetric survey in the sixties by Bruce C. Heezen and Marie Tharp which identified the abyssal cone and canyon structures. It was delineated and named by Joseph Curray and David Moore following a geological and geophysical survey in 1968.

=== Oceanographic chemistry ===
Coastal regions bordering the Bay of Bengal are rich in minerals. Sri Lanka, Serendib, or Ratna – Dweepa which means Gem Island. Amethyst, beryl, ruby, sapphire, topaz, and garnet are just some of the gems of Sri Lanka. Garnet and other precious gems are also found in abundance in the Indian states of Odisha and Andhra Pradesh. A 2014 study found that as a result of ocean acidification, there was reduced shell thickness of marine animals and breaking strength compared to normal shells. The study also showed that the pH in Bay of Bengal fell to 7.75 compared in 1994 when it averaged 7.95.

=== Oceanographic climate ===
From January to October, the current is northward flowing, and the clockwise circulation pattern is called the "East Indian Current". The Bay of Bengal monsoon moves in a northwest direction striking the Nicobar Islands, and the Andaman Islands first end of May, then coast of Mainland India by end of June.

The remainder of the year, the counterclockwise current is southwestward flowing, and the circulation pattern is called the East Indian Winter Jet. September and December see very active weather, season varsha (or monsoon), in the Bay of Bengal producing severe cyclones which affect eastern India. Several efforts have been initiated to cope with storm surge.

=== Marine biology, flora and fauna ===
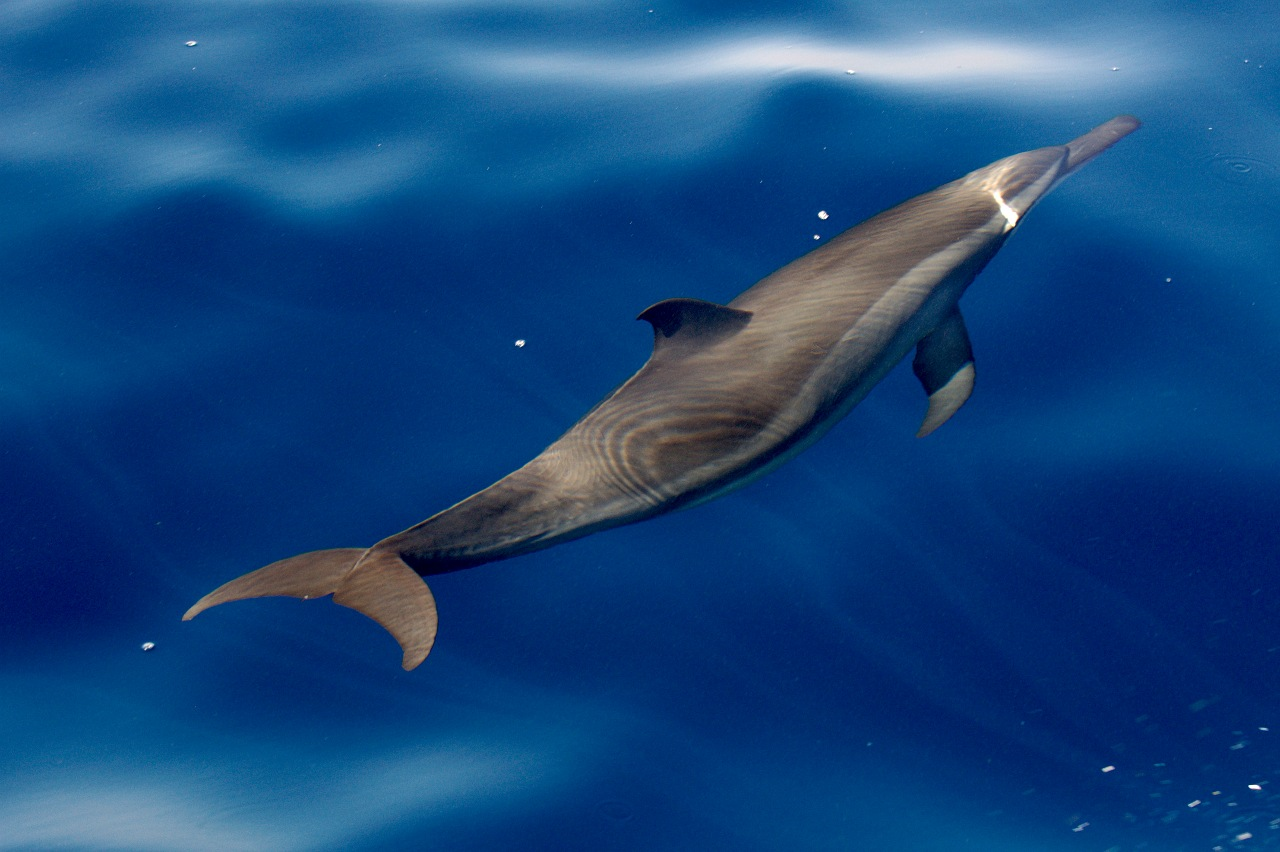
A spinner dolphin in Bay of Bengal

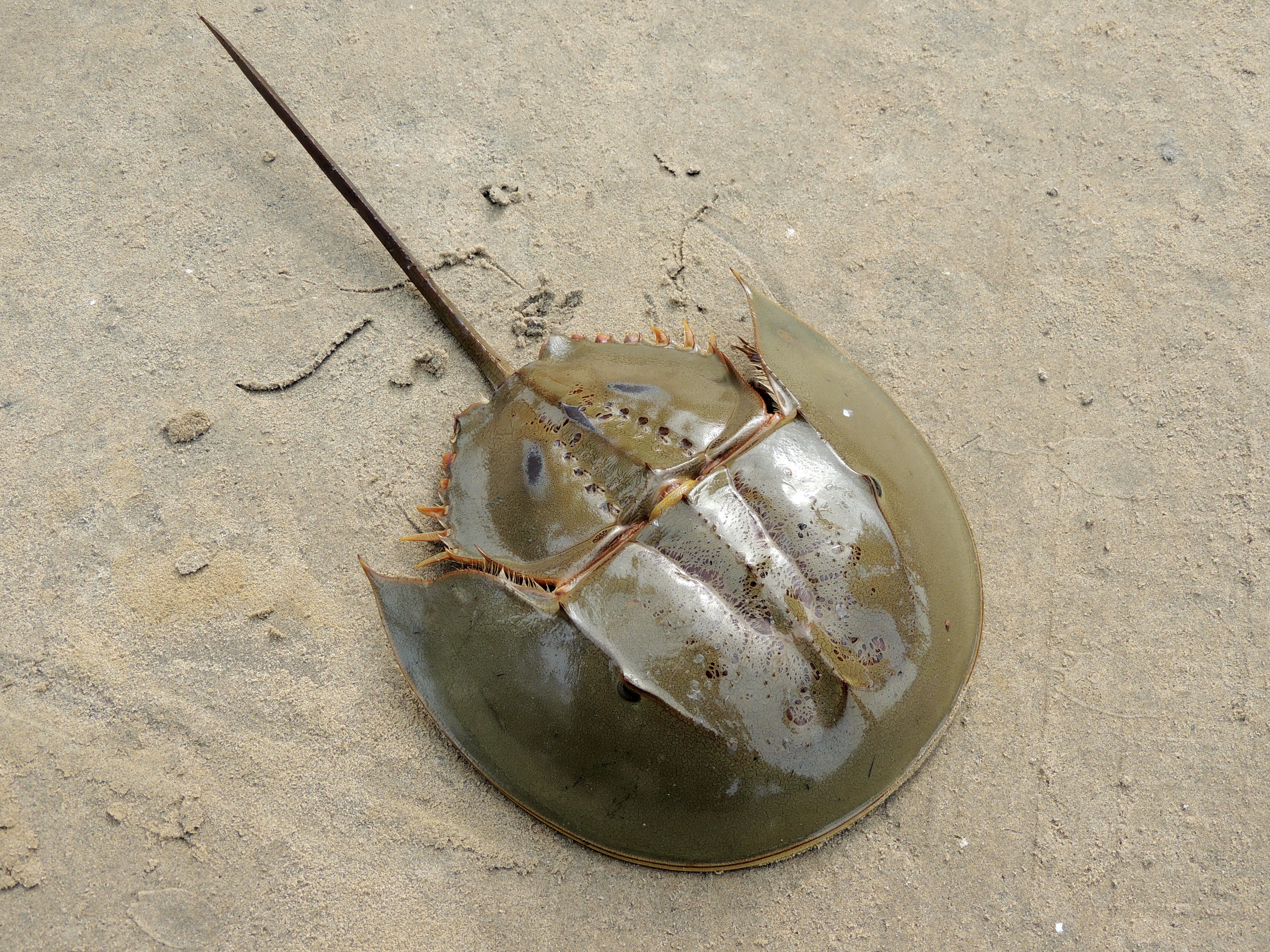
Tachypleus gigas in Odisha

The Bay of Bengal is full of biological diversity, diverging amongst coral reefs, estuaries, fish spawning and nursery areas, and mangroves. The Bay of Bengal is one of the World's 64 largest marine ecosystems.

Kerilia jerdonii is a sea snake of the Bay of Bengal. Glory of Bengal cone (Conus bengalensis) is just one of the seashells which can be photographed along beaches of the Bay of Bengal. An endangered species, the olive ridley sea turtle can survive because of the nesting grounds made available at the Gahirmatha Marine Wildlife Sanctuary, Gahirmatha Beach, Odisha, India. Marlin, barracuda, skipjack tuna (Katsuwonus pelamis), yellowfin tuna, Indo-Pacific humpback dolphin (Sousa chinensis), and Bryde's whale (Balaenoptera edeni) are a few of the marine animals. Bay of Bengal hogfish (Bodianus neilli) is a type of wrasse which live in turbid lagoon reefs or shallow coastal reefs. Schools of dolphins can be seen, whether they are the bottlenose dolphin (Tursiops truncatus), pantropical spotted dolphin (Stenella attenuata) or the spinner dolphin (S. longirostris). Tuna and dolphins usually reside in the same waters. In shallower and warmer coastal waters the Irrawaddy dolphin (Orcaella brevirostris) can be found.

The Great Nicobar Biosphere Reserve provides sanctuary to many animals some of which include the saltwater crocodile (Crocodylus porosus), leatherback sea turtle (Dermochelys coriacea), and Malayan box turtle (Cuora amboinensis kamaroma) to name a few.

Another endangered species royal Bengal tiger is supported by Sundarbans a large estuarine delta that holds a mangrove area in the Ganges River Delta.

== Transboundary issues ==
A transboundary issue is defined as an environmental problem in which either the cause of the problem and/or its impact is separated by a national boundary; or the problem contributes to a global environmental problem and finding regional solutions is considered to be a global environmental benefit. The eight Bay of Bengal countries have (2012) identified three major transboundary problems (or areas of concern) affecting the health of the Bay, that they can work on together. With the support of the Bay Of Bengal Large Marine Ecosystem Project (BOBLME), the eight countries are now (2012) developing responses to these issues and their causes, for future implementation as the Strategic Action Programme.

=== Ecological degradation ===
==== Fisheries overexploitation ====
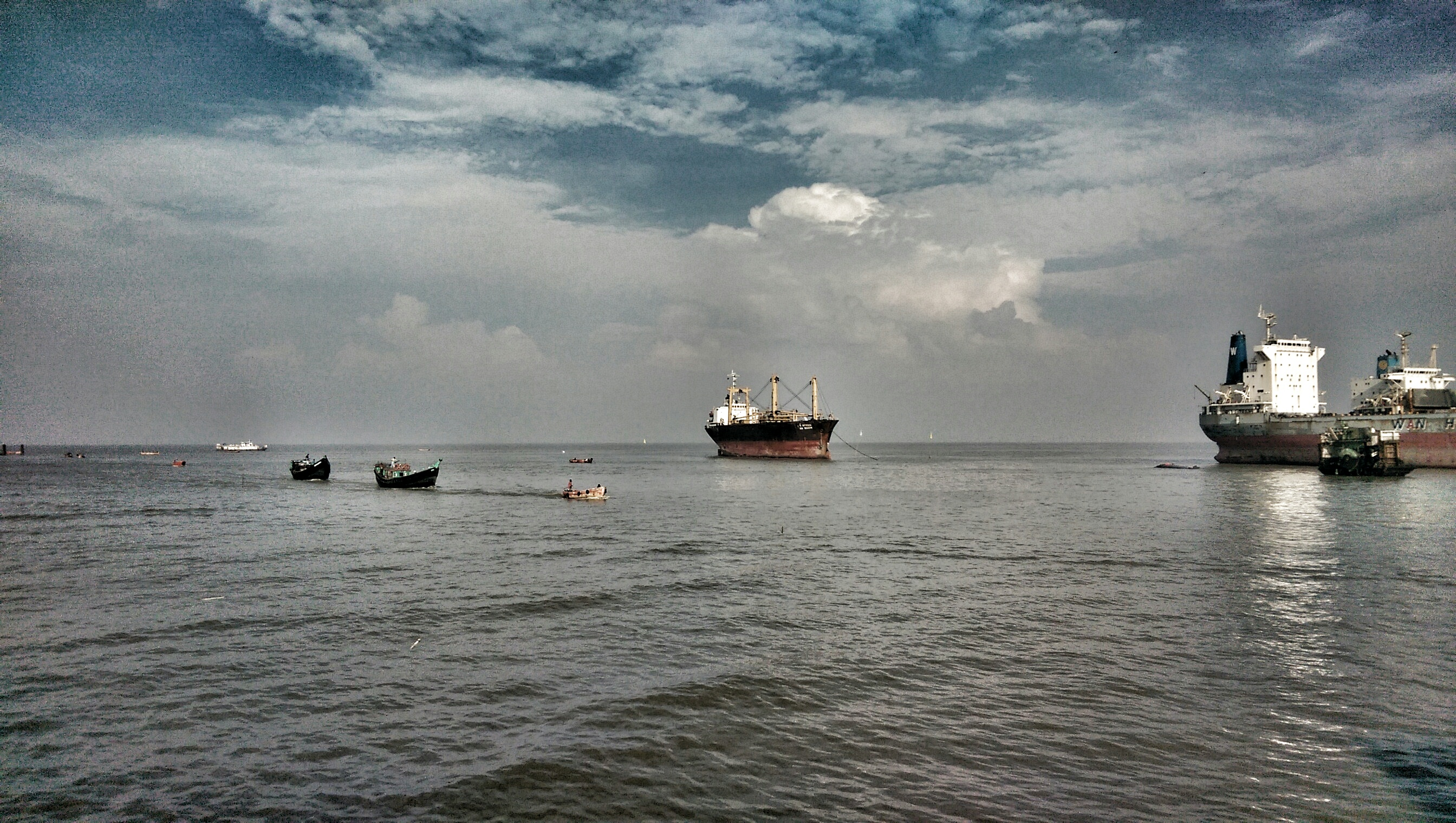
Some small fishing boats are catching fish & sell them in local coastal markets.

Fisheries production in the Bay of Bengal is 6,000,000 tonnes per year, more than 7% of the world's catch. The major transboundary issues relating to shared fisheries are: a decline in the overall availability of fish resources; changes in species composition of catches; the high proportion of juvenile fish in the catch; and changes in marine biodiversity, especially through loss of vulnerable and endangered species. The transboundary nature of these issues are: that many fish stocks are shared between BOBLME countries through the transboundary migration of fish, or larvae. Fishing overlaps national jurisdictions, both legally and illegally – overcapacity and overfishing in one location forces a migration of fishers and vessels to other locations. All countries (to a greater or lesser degree) are experiencing difficulties in implementing fisheries management, especially the ecosystem approach to fisheries. Bay of Bengal countries contribute significantly to the global problem of loss of vulnerable and endangered species. The main causes of the issues are: open access to fishing grounds; government emphasis on increasing fish catches; inappropriate government subsidies provided to fishers; increasing fishing effort, especially from trawlers and purse seiners; high consumer demand for fish, including for seed and fishmeal for aquaculture; ineffective fisheries management; and illegal and destructive fishing.

==== Marine habitats degradation ====
The Bay of Bengal is an area of high biodiversity, with many endangered and vulnerable species. The major transboundary issues relating to habitats are: the loss and degradation of mangrove habitats; degradation of coral reefs; and the loss of, and damage to, seagrasses. The transboundary nature of these major issues are: that all three critical habitats occur in all BOBLME countries. Coastal development for several varying uses of the land and sea are common in all BOBLME countries. Trade in products from all the habitats is transboundary in nature. Climate change impacts are shared by all BOBLME countries. The main causes of the issues are: food security needs of the coastal poor; lack of coastal development plans; increasing trade in products from coastal habitats; coastal development and industrialization; ineffective marine protected areas and lack of enforcement; upstream development that affects water-flow; intensive upstream agricultural practices; and increasing tourism.

=== Environmental degradation ===
==== Environmental hazards ====
The Asian brown cloud, a layer of air pollution that covers much of South Asia and the Indian Ocean every year between January and March, and possibly also during earlier and later months, hangs over the Bay of Bengal. It is considered to be a combination of vehicle exhaust, smoke from cooking fires, and industrial discharges. Because of this cloud, satellites attempting to track ocean acidification and other ocean health indicators in the Bay have difficulty obtaining accurate measurements.

==== Pollution and water quality ====
The major transboundary issues relating to pollution and water quality are: sewage-borne pathogens and organic load; solid waste/marine litter; increasing nutrient inputs; oil pollution; persistent organic pollutants (POPs) and persistent toxic substances (PTSs); sedimentation; and heavy metals. The transboundary nature of these issues are: discharge of untreated/partially treated sewage being a common problem. Sewage and organic discharges from the Ganges-Brahmaputra-Meghna River are likely to be transboundary. Plastics and derelict fishing gear can be transported long distances across national boundaries. Around 4 million tonnes of microplastics are estimated to come from India and Bangladesh travelling into Sundurban and subsequently the Bay of Bengal. High nutrient discharges from rivers could intensify large-scale hypoxia. Atmospheric transport of nutrients is inherently transboundary. Differences between countries with regard to regulation and enforcement of shipping discharges may drive discharges across boundaries. Tar balls are transported long distances. POPs/PTSs and mercury, including organo-mercury, undergo long-range transport. Sedimentation and most heavy metal contamination tend to be localized and lack a strong transboundary dimension. The main causes of the issues are: increasing coastal population density and urbanization; higher consumption, resulting in more waste generated per person; insufficient funds allocated to waste management; migration of industry into BOBLME countries; and proliferation of small industries. A pertinent issue is the rapid growth of the shrimp culture industry which requires use of antibiotics and chemicals for export-quality food safety but pollutes the Bay of Bengal.

=== Tropical storms and cyclones ===
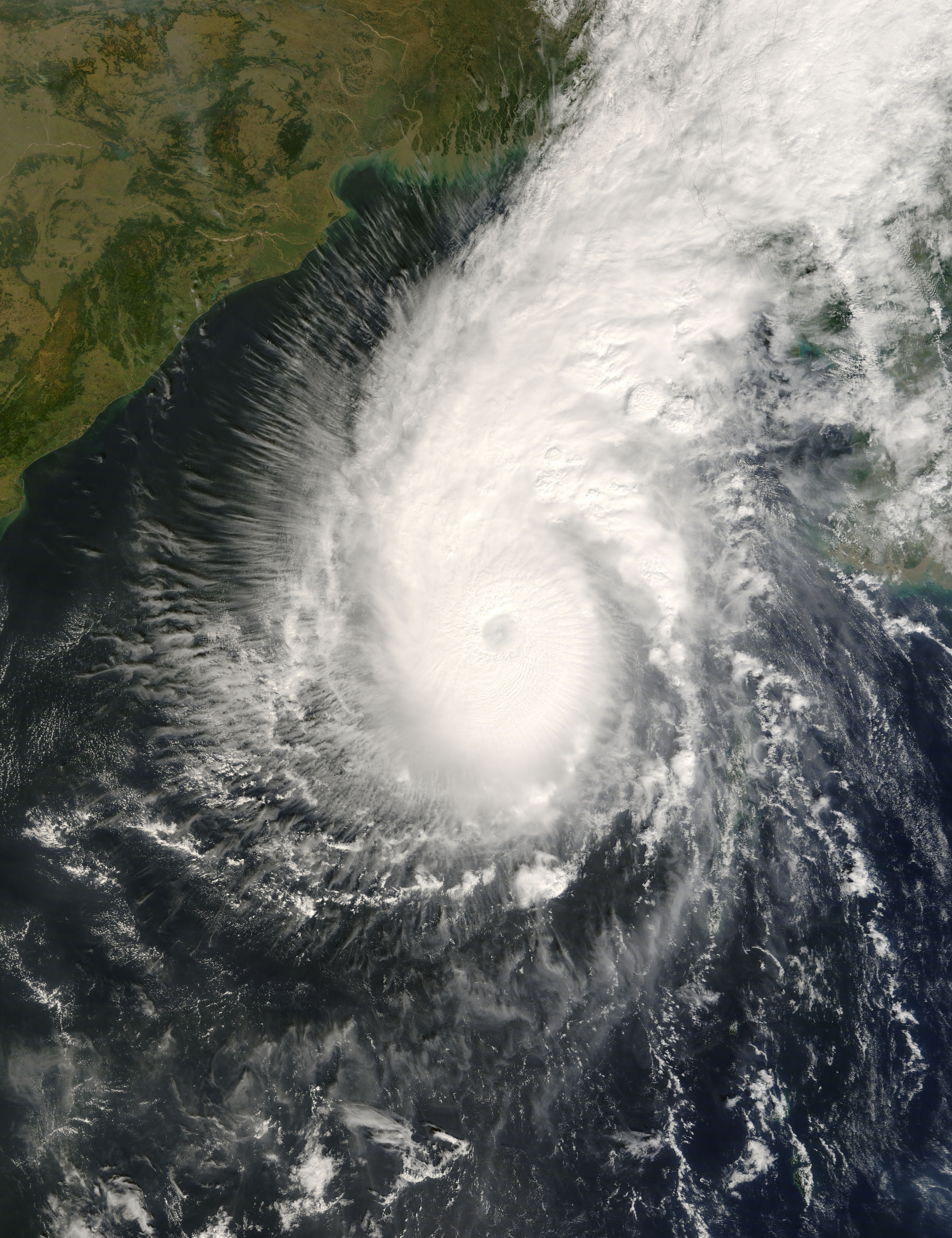
Cyclone Sidr at its peak near Bangladesh

A tropical storm with rotating winds blowing at speeds of 119 km/h (74 mph) is called a cyclone when they originate over the Bay of Bengal, and called a hurricane in the Atlantic. Between 100,000 and 500,000 residents of Bangladesh were killed because of the 1970 Bhola cyclone.

- 2023: Extremely Severe Cyclonic Storm Mocha
- 2021: Very Severe Cyclonic Storm Yaas
- 2020: Very Severe Cyclonic Storm Nivar
- 2020: Super Cyclonic Storm Amphan
- 2019: Very Severe Cyclonic Storm Bulbul
- 2019: Extremely Severe Cyclonic Storm Fani
- 2018: Very Severe Cyclonic Storm Gaja
- 2018: Cyclone Titli
- 2017: Severe Cyclonic Storm Mora
- 2017: Cyclone Maarutha
- 2016: Very Severe Cyclonic Storm Vardah
- 2016: Cyclone Nada
- 2016: Cyclone Kyant
- 2016: Cyclone Roanu
- 2015: Cyclone Komen
- 2014: Very Severe Cyclonic Storm Hudhud
- 2013: Very Severe Cyclonic Storm Phailin
- 2013: Cyclone Viyaru
- 2012: Cyclone Nilam
- 2011: Very Severe Cyclonic Storm Thane
- 2010: Very Severe Cyclonic Storm Giri
- 2009: Very Severe Cyclonic Storm Aila
- 2008: Very Severe Cyclonic Storm Nargis
- 2007: Very Severe Cyclonic Storm Sidr
- 2006: Very Severe Cyclonic Storm Mala
- 1999: Odisha Super Cyclonic Storm 05B
- 1996: Konaseema Cyclone
- 1991: Super Cyclonic Storm 02B
- 1989: November Typhoon Gay
- 1985: May Tropical Storm One (1B)
- 1982: April Cyclone One (1B)
- 1982: May Tropical Storm Two (2B)
- 1982: October Tropical Storm Three (3B)
- 1981: December Cyclone Three (3B)
- 1980: October Tropical Storm One (1B)
- 1980: December Unknown Storm Four (4B)
- 1980: December Tropical Storm Five (5B)
- 1977: Andhra Pradesh Cyclone (6B)
- 1971: Odisha cyclone
- 1970: Bhola cyclone
- The 1864 Calcutta Cyclone: caused a storm surge of 40 feet. Barometer 28.025 inches of mercury. 50,000 direct deaths and 30,000 from disease.
- The Backergunge cyclone of 1876: 10 to 30 or 40 feet storm surge. 100,000 direct deaths and 100,000 indirect from disease.
- The False Point cyclone of 1885: 22 feet of storm surge. Barometer 27.135 inches of mercury.

== See also ==
- History of Indian influence on Southeast Asia
- Maritime Silk Road
- Arabian Sea
- Bangladesh and the Indo-Pacific Strategy
