= German submarine U-859 =

German World War II submarine

History

Nazi Germany
- Name: U-859
- Ordered: 5 June 1941
- Builder: DeSchiMAG AG Weser, Bremen
- Yard number: 1065
- Laid down: 15 May 1942
- Launched: 2 March 1943
- Commissioned: 8 July 1943
- Fate: Sunk on 23 September 1944

General characteristics
- Class & type: Type IXD2 submarine
- Displacement: 1,610 t (1,580 long tons) surfaced; 1,799 t (1,771 long tons) submerged
- Length: 87.58 m (287 ft 4 in) o/a; 68.50 m (224 ft 9 in) pressure hull
- Beam: 7.50 m (24 ft 7 in) o/a; 4.40 m (14 ft 5 in) pressure hull
- Height: 10.20 m (33 ft 6 in)
- Draught: 5.35 m (17 ft 7 in)
- Installed power: 9,000 PS (6,620 kW; 8,880 bhp) (diesels); 1,000 PS (740 kW; 990 shp) (electric)
- Propulsion: 2 shafts; 2 × diesel engines; 2 × electric motors
- Speed: 20.8 knots (38.5 km/h; 23.9 mph) surfaced; 6.9 knots (12.8 km/h; 7.9 mph) submerged
- Range: 12,750 nmi (23,610 km; 14,670 mi) at 10 knots (19 km/h; 12 mph) surfaced; 57 nmi (106 km; 66 mi) at 4 knots (7.4 km/h; 4.6 mph) submerged
- Test depth: Calculated crush depth: 230 m (750 ft)
- Boats & landing craft carried: 2 dinghies
- Complement: 55–64 officers & ratings
- Armament: 6 × torpedo tubes (four bow, two stern); 24 × 53.3 cm (21 in) torpedoes; 1 × 3.7 cm (1.5 in) Flak M42 AA gun; 2 × twin 2 cm (0.79 in) C/30 anti-aircraft guns

Service record
- Part of: 4th U-boat Flotilla; 8 July 1943 – 31 March 1944; 12th U-boat Flotilla; 1 April – 23 September 1944
- Identification codes: M 53 706
- Commanders: Kptlt. Johann Jebsen; 8 July 1943 – 23 September 1944
- Operations: 1 patrol: 8 April – 23 September 1944
- Victories: 3 merchant ships sunk (20,853 GRT)

German submarine U-859 was a Type IXD2 U-boat built for Nazi Germany's Kriegsmarine during World War II. She was one of a select number of U-boats to join Monsun Gruppe or Monsoon Group, which operated in the Far East alongside the Imperial Japanese Navy.

== Construction ==
U-859 was built in Bremen during 1942 and 1943, and was heavily adapted following her completion in July 1943, with the addition of a snorkel to enable her to stay underwater for longer during the hazardous passage to Penang in Malaya. Thus she was not ready for war service until the spring of 1944, when following her working up period and modifications she departed Kiel for the East.

== Design ==
German Type IXD2 submarines were considerably larger than the original Type IXs. U-859 had a displacement of 1,610 tonnes (1,580 long tons) when at the surface and 1,799 tonnes (1,771 long tons) while submerged. The U-boat had a total length of 87.58 m (287 ft 4 in), a pressure hull length of 68.50 m (224 ft 9 in), a beam of 7.50 m (24 ft 7 in), a height of 10.20 m (33 ft 6 in), and a draught of 5.35 m (17 ft 7 in). The submarine was powered by two MAN M 9 V 40/46 supercharged four-stroke, nine-cylinder diesel engines plus two MWM RS34.5S six-cylinder four-stroke diesel engines for cruising, producing a total of 9,000 metric horsepower (6,620 kW; 8,880 shp) for use while surfaced, two Siemens-Schuckert 2 GU 345/34 double-acting electric motors producing a total of 1,000 shaft horsepower (1,010 PS; 750 kW) for use while submerged. She had two shafts and two 1.85 m (6 ft) propellers. The boat was capable of operating at depths of up to 200 metres (660 ft).

The submarine had a maximum surface speed of 20.8 knots (38.5 km/h; 23.9 mph) and a maximum submerged speed of 6.9 knots (12.8 km/h; 7.9 mph). When submerged, the boat could operate for 121 nautical miles (224 km; 139 mi) at 2 knots (3.7 km/h; 2.3 mph); when surfaced, she could travel 12,750 nautical miles (23,610 km; 14,670 mi) at 10 knots (19 km/h; 12 mph). U-859 was fitted with six 53.3 cm (21 in) torpedo tubes (four fitted at the bow and two at the stern), 24 torpedoes, and a 3.7 cm (1.5 in) Flak M42 with 2575 rounds as well as two twin 2 cm (0.79 in) C/30 anti-aircraft guns with 8100 rounds. The boat had a complement of fifty-five.

== Service history ==
Although U-859 only had a single war patrol from which she never returned, her six month career was highly eventful and carried her halfway across the world and into an entirely different theatre of conflict.

Commanded by Kapitänleutnant Johann Jebsen, U-859 sailed from Kiel for Penang on 4 April 1944, carrying 31 tons of mercury in metal flasks intended for use by the Japanese munitions industry. She avoided shipping lanes and during her time in the North Atlantic, remained submerged for 23 hours every day, running on her schnorkel. She would surface for just one hour each day at 23:00, later reduced to 15 minutes each day.

=== Colin ===
Three weeks into the voyage, Colin, a formerly-Italian freighter that had been taken over by American authorities and registered in Panama, was slowly steaming unescorted in the North Atlantic following engine failure. U-859 sank her with three torpedoes before proceeding southwards.

The boat's voyage continued smoothly for the next two months, rounding the Cape of Good Hope and entering the Indian Ocean without trouble. On 5 July she was spotted by a Lockheed Ventura aircraft, which swooped down on the boat before being downed by her anti-aircraft guns, leaving no survivors. One rating of U-859 was killed and one officer seriously injured. Some sources say the aircraft was actually a Catalina anti-submarine plane.

=== John Barry ===
Her second victim became one of the most famous treasure shipwrecks of the twentieth century. The unescorted Liberty ship John Barry was transporting a cargo of 3 million silver one-riyal coins from Aden to Ras Tanura in the Persian Gulf as part of an American government agreement with the Saudi royal family. The coins had been minted in America for King Abdul Aziz Al-Saud and were stacked in huge boxes in the hold, going down with the ship when she was torpedoed at 15°10′N 55°18′E, about 100 nautical miles (190 km; 120 mi) south of the entrance to the Arabian Sea. A massive salvage operation in 1994 retrieved many of the lost coins.

=== Troilus ===
Three days later another unescorted merchantman, the British Troilus was also sunk, with six hands drowned.

== Fate ==
On 23 September 1944 U-859 was running on the surface, within 23 nmi (43 km; 26 mi) of Penang and the end of her voyage, when she was intercepted in the Malacca Straits by the British submarine HMS Trenchant, which had been forewarned of her arrival date and route by decrypted German signals. In difficult conditions with a heavy swell running and a second U-boat thought to be lurking, Trenchant's commander Arthur Hezlet carried out a snap attack using his stern torpedo tubes, hitting U-859 amidships. The U-boat sank immediately in 50 m (160 ft) of water with several compartments flooded. 47 men drowned, including her commander.

Twenty of the crew escaped by opening the hatch in the relatively shallow sea, struggling to the calm surface. Eleven survivors were picked up by HMS Trenchant immediately following the sinking, and the remaining nine were picked up by the Japanese after 24 hours adrift. They were then taken ashore to await repatriation.

== Salvage ==
In 1972 a total of 12 tons of mercury were recovered from U-859 and brought to Singapore. The West German Embassy claimed ownership of the mercury. The Receiver of Wreck took possession of the mercury, and the High Court of Singapore ruled that "the German state has never ceased to exist despite Germany's unconditional surrender in 1945 and whatever was the property of the German State, unless it was captured and taken away by one of the Allied Powers, still remains the property of the German State..."

== Summary of raiding history ==
Date	Ship Name	Nationality	Tonnage (GRT)	Fate
26 April 1944	Colin	Panama	6,255	Sunk
28 August 1944	John Barry	United States	7,176	Sunk
1 September 1944	Troilus	United Kingdom	7,422	Sunk

== Bibliography ==
- Busch, Rainer; Röll, Hans-Joachim (1999). German U-boat commanders of World War II : a biographical dictionary. Translated by Brooks, Geoffrey. London, Annapolis, Md: Greenhill Books, Naval Institute Press. ISBN 1-55750-186-6.
- Busch, Rainer; Röll, Hans-Joachim (1999). Der U-Boot-Krieg, 1939-1945: Deutsche U-Boot-Verluste von September 1939 bis Mai 1945 [German U-boat losses from September 1939 to May 1945] (in German). Vol. IV. Hamburg, Berlin, Bonn: Mittler. ISBN 3-8132-0514-2.
- Gröner, Eric; Jung, Dieter; Maass, Martin (1991). German Warships 1815-1945: U-boats and Mine Warfare Vessels. Vol. 2. Translated by Thomas, Keith; Magowan, Rachel. London: Conway Maritime Press. ISBN 0-85177-593-4.
- Sharpe, Peter (1998). U-Boat Fact File. Great Britain: Midland Publishing. ISBN 1-85780-072-9.
