= Anchor Line =

Anchor Line may refer to:

- Anchor Line (riverboat company), a Mississippi steamer service from 1859 to 1898
- Anchor Line (steamship company), a transatlantic steamship company founded in 1856 and acquired by Cunard Line in 1911

== See also ==
- Anchor (disambiguation)
- Blue Anchor Line, a shipping company operating between the UK, South Africa, and Australia from 1870 to 1910
