= SS John Barry =

World War II Liberty ship of the United States

History

United States
- Name: John Barry
- Namesake: Commodore John Barry
- Builder: Kaiser Shipyards, Portland, Oregon
- Yard number: 174
- Way number: 4
- Laid down: 11 July 1941
- Launched: 23 November 1941
- Completed: 17 February 1942
- Fate: Torpedoed and sunk, 28 August 1944

General characteristics
- Class & type: Type EC2-S-C1 Liberty ship
- Displacement: 14,245 long tons (14,474 t)
- Length: 441 ft 6 in (134.57 m) o/a; 417 ft 9 in (127.33 m) p/p; 427 ft (130 m) w/l
- Beam: 57 ft (17 m)
- Draft: 27 ft 9 in (8.46 m)
- Propulsion: Two oil-fired boilers; Triple-expansion steam engine; 2,500 hp (1,900 kW); Single screw
- Speed: 11 knots (20 km/h; 13 mph)
- Range: 20,000 nmi (37,000 km; 23,000 mi)
- Capacity: 10,856 t (10,685 long tons) deadweight (DWT)
- Crew: 81
- Armament: Stern-mounted 4 in (100 mm) deck gun for use against surfaced submarines, variety of anti-aircraft guns

SS John Barry was a 7,200-ton American Liberty ship in World War II. The ship was built at one of the Kaiser Shipyards in Portland, Oregon, and launched on 23 November 1941. Operated by Lykes Brothers Steamship Company under charter with the Maritime Commission and War Shipping Administration. The John Barry was torpedoed and sunk in the Arabian Sea at position 15.10°N 55.18°E in 1944.

== Sinking ==
The ship left its convoy under radio silence to go on a mission to Dhahran in Saudi Arabia when it was torpedoed 185 kilometres (115 mi) off the coast of Oman by the German submarine U-859 on 28 August 1944. Two crewmen were killed in the sinking and the survivors were rescued the next day. The SS John Barry was carrying a cargo of 3 million American-minted Saudi one-riyal silver coins as an American payment associated with ARAMCO. The reason for this shipment (one of several during the war) was that Saudi Arabia did not use paper money at the time and this led to a war-time shortage of currency with which to pay workers building new oil refineries and other US facilities at newly founded Dhahran.

Because the exact nature of the cargo was a secret, rumors spread that the SS John Barry carried a vast shipment of 26 million US$ (1944 value) worth of silver bullion to India as well as the smaller cargo of coins. After the recovery effort of this purported treasure failed (see below), it was discovered that all silver shipments to India were accounted for and a new destination for the silver bullion was theorized, the Soviet Union.

== Recovery ==
The ship had sunk to 8,500 feet below the sea surface, far beyond the reaches of most undersea recovery methods. Forty-five years later, however, Skeikh Ahmed Farid al Aulaqi was granted salvage rights. Retired U.S. Navy Captain Brian Shoemaker, former General Counsel of the Navy, Hugh O'Neill, attorney H. McGuire "Mac" Riley of Howrey & Simon in Washington, D.C., and Jay Fiondella, owner of "Chez Jay", a celebrity-renowned seafood dive in Santa Monica, California, successfully bid for the salvage rights from the U.S. Government. In order to raise the money to retrieve the John Barry they formed a partnership called "The John Barry Group".

Contractors from Houston, Texas, were initially involved in the search, and their efforts were later augmented by the Toulon-based Institut Français de Recherche pour l'Exploitation de la Mer (IFREMER). In October 1994, a modified drilling ship (Drillship was the FlexLD, formerly Sedco 445 and later Peregrin VII and now Deepwater Navigator), carrying a 50-ton video-equipped grab designed by IFREMER, sailed to the location of the John Barry. By early November, much of the ship had been excavated, revealing vintage U.S. Army trucks, tanks, and military equipment. Soon after, the first sign of silver was seen (though initially the video feed was clouded by the ship's oil sticking to the camera lens). Over the next five days, the grab brought up 1.3 million Saudi riyals weighing 17 tons and showered them onto the drill-ship's deck. The purported Indian/Soviet silver was nowhere to be found, although the salvagers were unable to access all the locations they suspected the silver might rest. While some plans have surfaced to relaunch the recovery effort, none have come to fruition.
