= Kadakkarappally =

- Village
- Location in Kerala, India Kadakkarappally (India)
- Coordinates: 9°42′0″N 76°18′0″E
- Country: India
- State: Kerala
- District: Alappuzha

Population (2011)
  - Total: 20,487

Languages
  - Official: Malayalam, English
- Time zone: UTC+5:30 (IST)
- PIN: 688529
- Vehicle registration: kl-32
- Nearest city: Cherthala
- Lok Sabha constituency: Alappuzha
- Vidhan Sabha constituency: Cherthala
- Website: www.cherthalaonline.com

Kadakkarappally is a village in Alappuzha district in the Indian state of Kerala. It is a panchayat which comes under the Cherthala Assembly constituency.

The village is home to St. Mary's Forane Church, Thankey.

== List of ward members of Kadakkarapally ==
The Panchayat president is the head of this panchayat. People do not directly elect the president. The ward members elect the president who can rule for five years with the members' support.

== Demographics ==
As of 2011 India census, Kadakkarappally had a population of 20,487, of whom 10,142 were male and 10,345 were female.

== Gallery ==
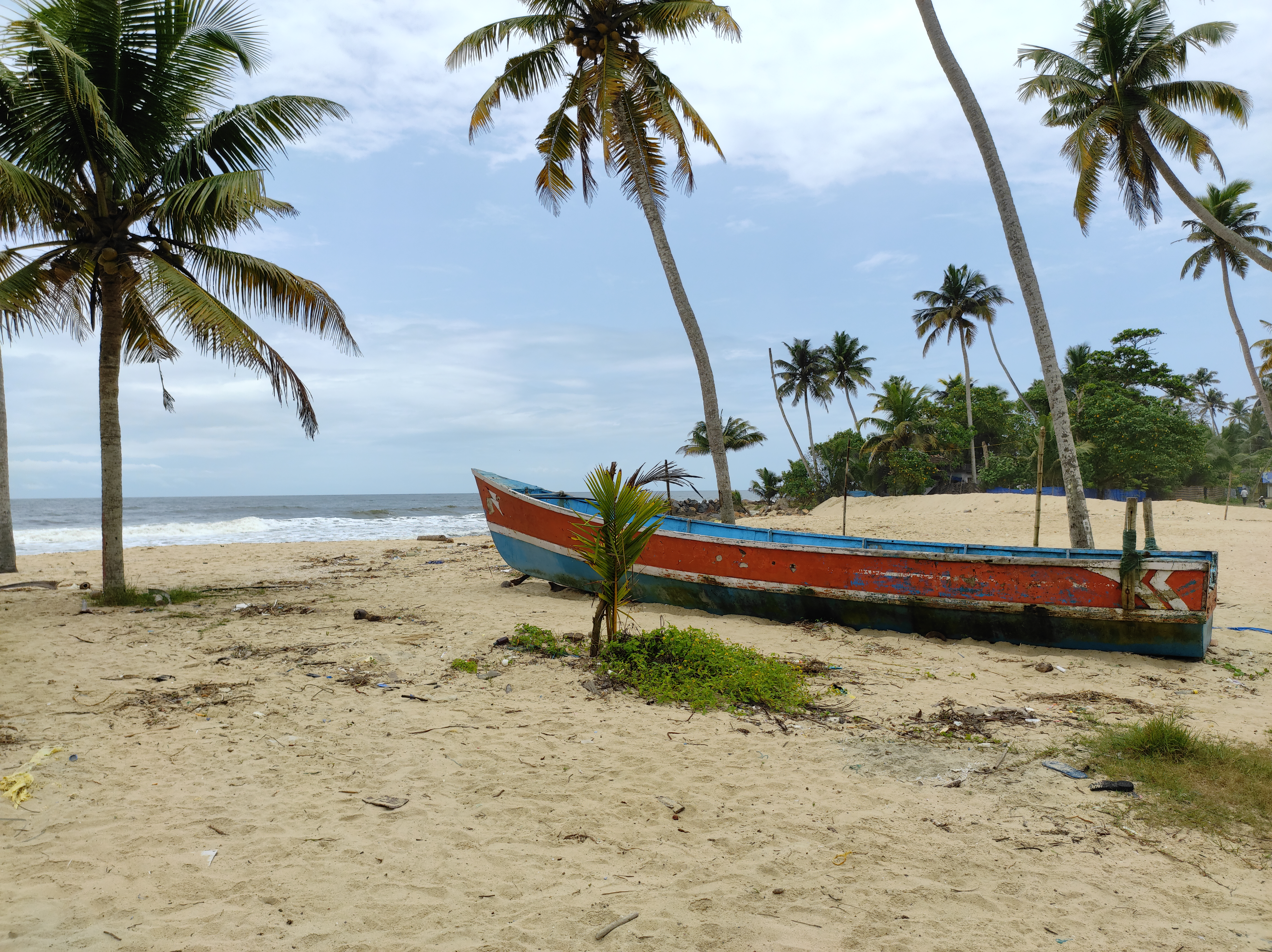
Ottamassery beach

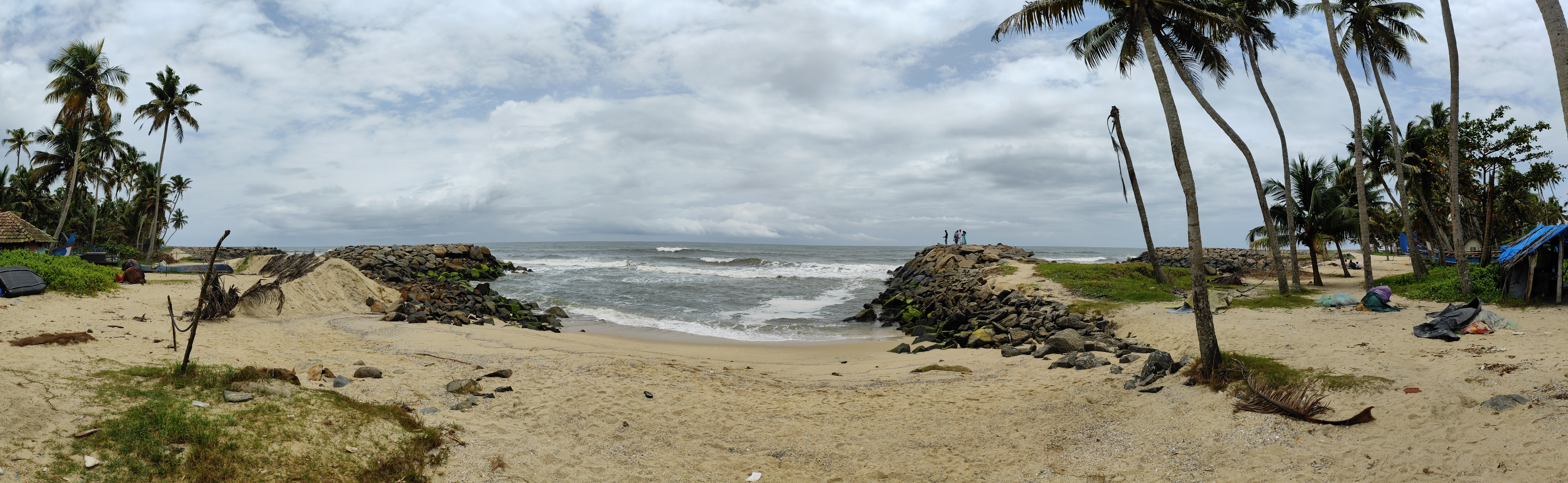
Thaickal beach

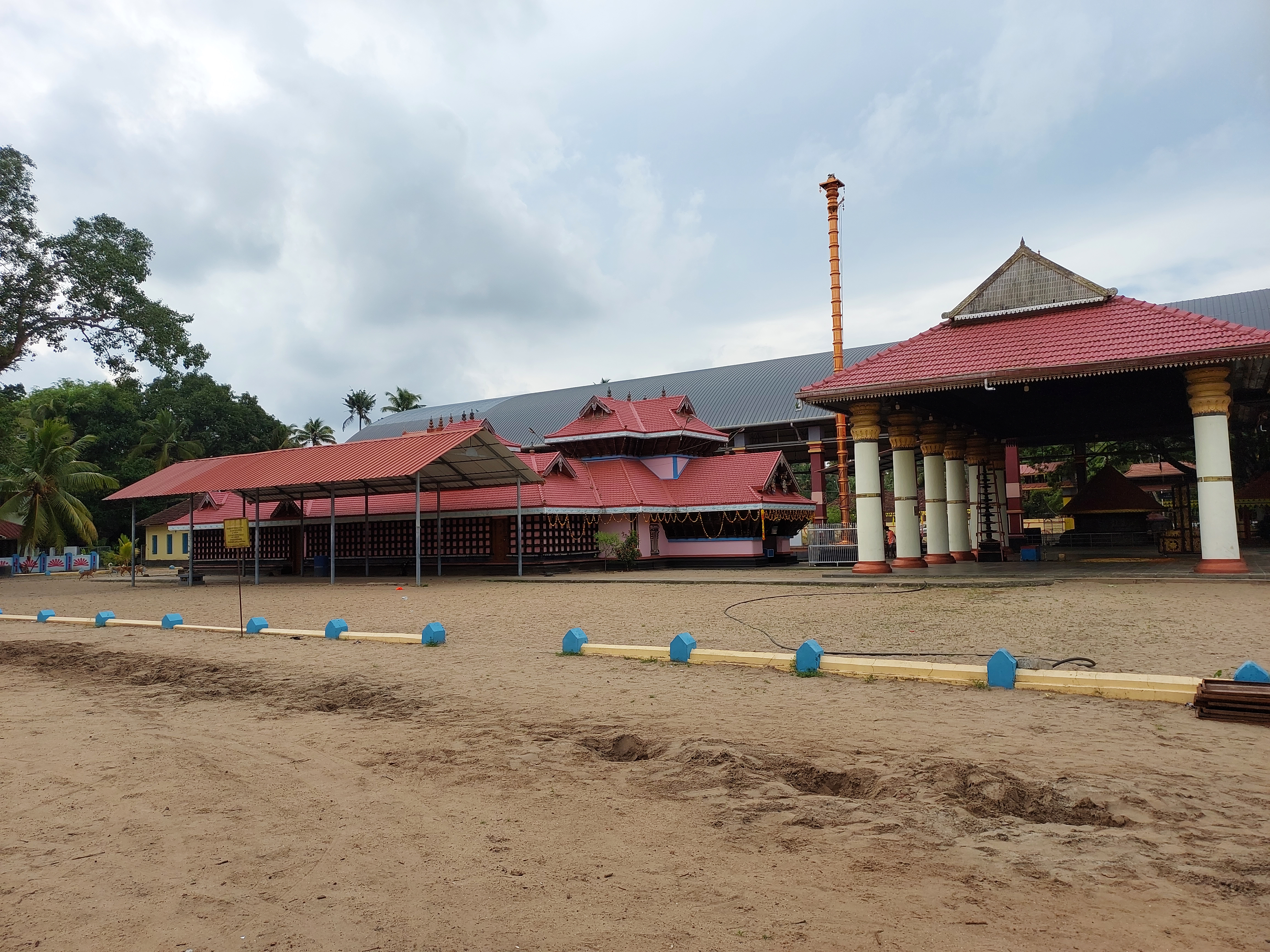
Kandamangalam temple

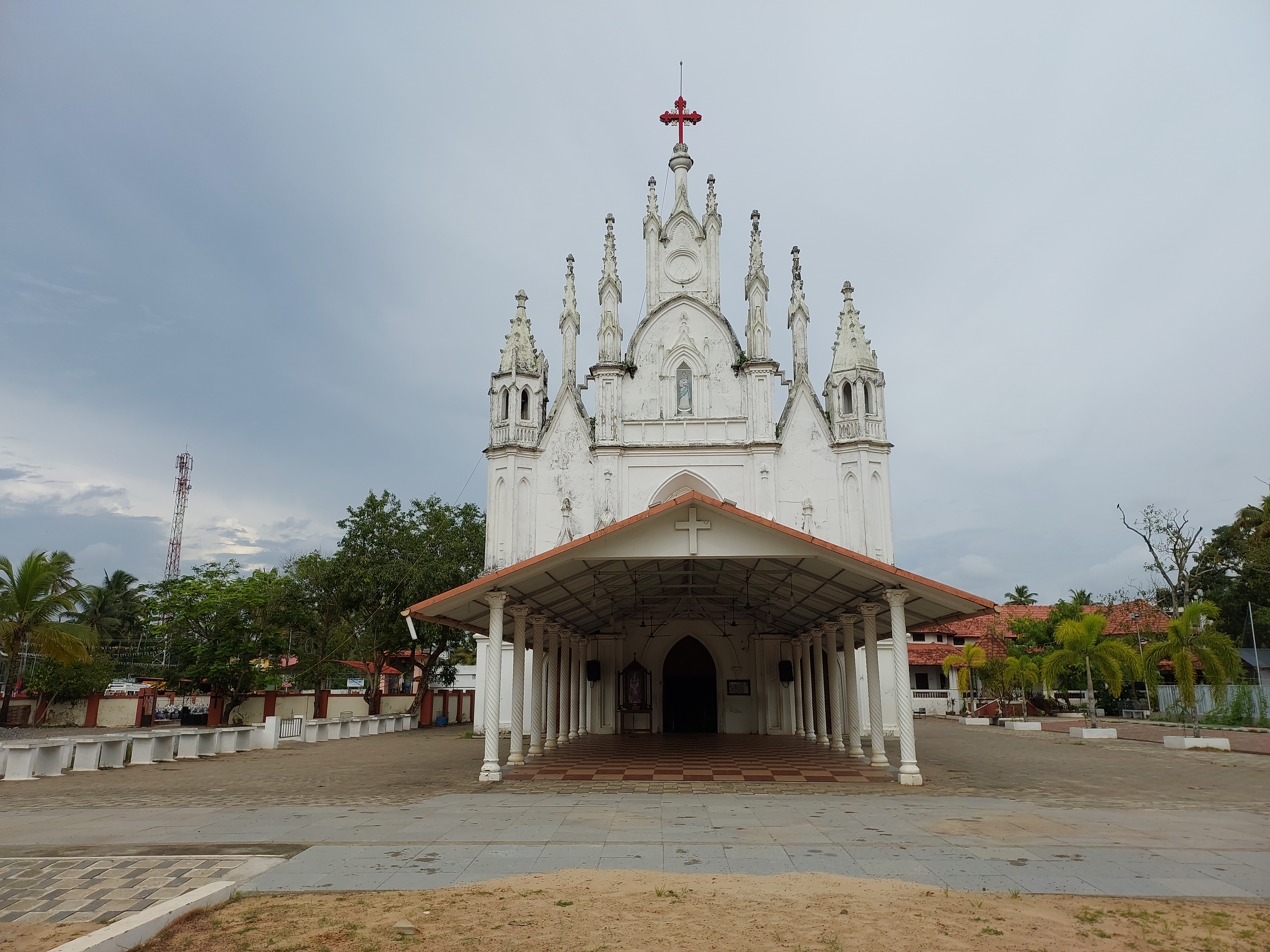
Thankey church
