= German submarine U-116 =

U-116 may refer to one of the following German submarines:

- U-116, a German Type U-115 submarine built by Schichau in Danzig. Never completed she was broken up and her main engines used in SMS Gefion.
- SM UB-116, a Type UB III submarine launched in 1917 for service in the First World War and was sunk on 28 October 1918 at Scapa Flow
- German submarine U-116 (1941), a Type XB submarine that served in the Second World War and went missing in October 1942
