= German submarine U-115 =

U-115 may refer to one of the following German submarines:

- SM U-115, the lead ship of the Type U 115 submarines; laid down during the First World War; unfinished at the end of the war; broken up incomplete; diesel engines used in SMS Gefion
  - During the First World War, Germany also had this submarine with a similar name:
    - SM UB-115, a Type UB III submarine ordered in 1917 and sunk 29 September 1918
- German submarine U-115 (1939), would have been a Type XIB submarine, a large cruiser submarine capable of carrying an Arado Ar 231 aircraft; laid down in 1939, but cancelled after the outbreak of the Second World War
