= List of unprotected cruisers of Germany =

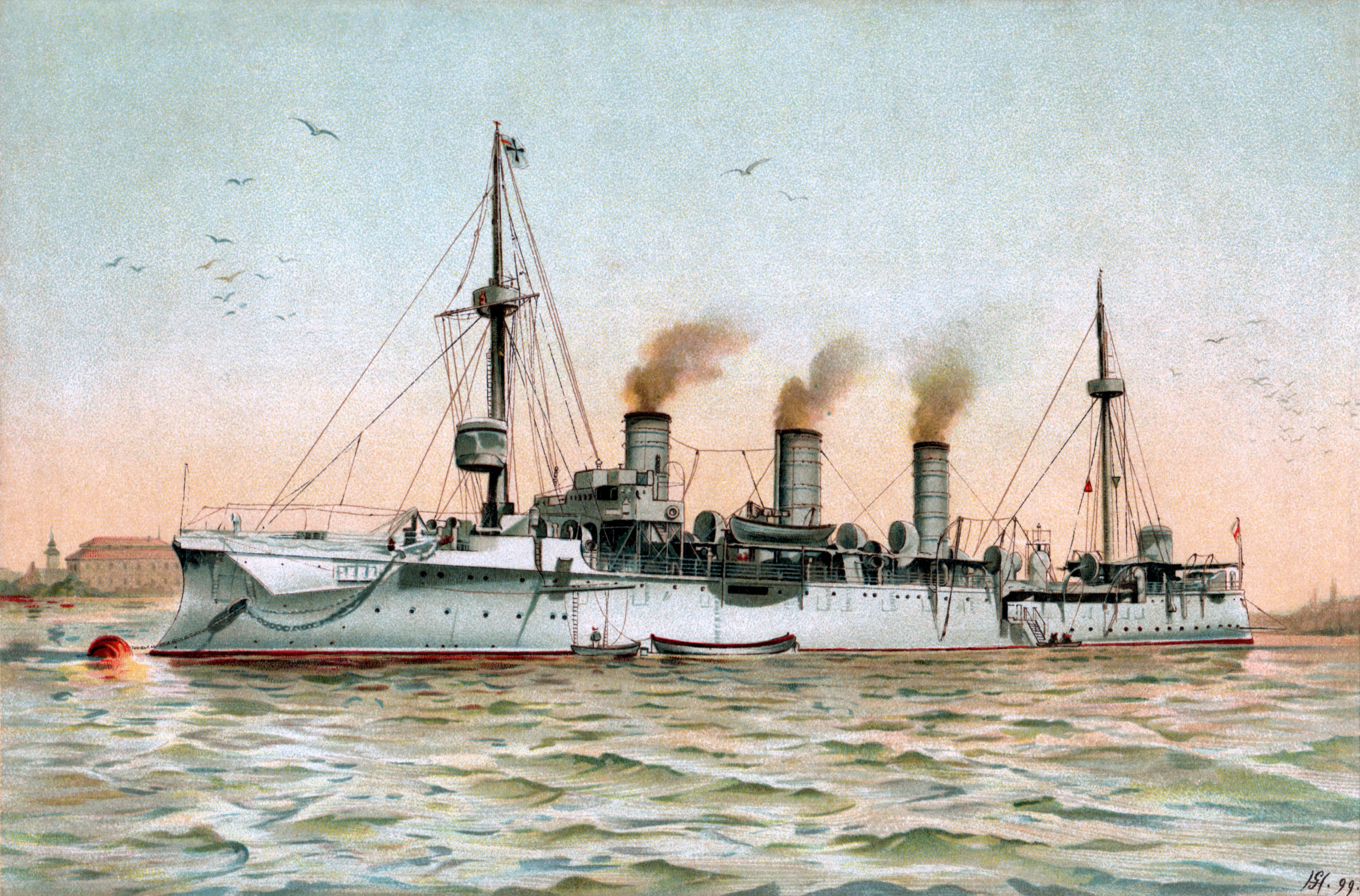
A 1902 lithograph of SMS Gefion

In the 1880s and 1890s, Germany built nine unprotected cruisers in three classes. These ships proved to be transitional designs, and experience gathered with them and a series of avisos helped to produce the first light cruisers of the German Navy. The unprotected cruisers, generally designed for service in Germany's colonial empire, required great endurance and relatively heavy firepower. The first ships of the type, the two Schwalbe-class cruisers, were acquired in an effort to modernize an aged cruiser force that relied primarily on old sail frigates. The new ships were primarily steam-powered but retained auxiliary sailing rigs. The second design, the Bussard class, was larger than the Schwalbe class and mounted newer, quick-firing guns, but was otherwise generally similar in capabilities. SMS Gefion, the final cruiser of the type, represented an attempt to merge the requirements for a colonial cruiser with those for a fleet scout as a result of Germany's chronically small naval budget; the design was unsatisfactory, and rather than continuing to build unprotected cruisers, German naval designers began work on the Gazelle class, the first modern light cruiser of the German Navy.

All nine cruisers served extensively in Germany's colonies and foreign interests, particularly in Africa, Asia, and the Pacific. They participated in the suppression of numerous rebellions, including the Abushiri Revolt in German East Africa in 1889–90, the Boxer Uprising in China in 1900–1901, and the Sokehs Rebellion in the Caroline Islands in 1911. Most of the ships were recalled to Germany and decommissioned by the early 1910s, having been replaced by the newer light cruisers. Bussard and Falke were scrapped in 1912, but the rest continued on in secondary roles. Of the remaining seven ships, only Cormoran and Geier remained abroad at the start of World War I in August 1914. Cormoran was stationed in Qingdao, but her engines were worn out, so she was scuttled to prevent her capture. Geier briefly operated against British shipping in the Pacific before running low on coal. She put into Hawaii, where she was interned by the US Navy. After the United States declared war on Germany in April 1917, she was seized and commissioned into American service as USS Schurz, though she was accidentally sunk in a collision in June 1918. Seeadler, employed as a mine storage hulk in Wilhelmshaven during the war, was destroyed by an accidental explosion in 1917. Condor, Schwalbe, Sperber, and Gefion were used in a variety of secondary roles during the war, including as floating barracks, training cruisers, and target ships. The first three ships were all broken up for scrap in the early 1920s, while Gefion was briefly used as a freighter, before she too was scrapped, in 1923.

Key
Armament	The number and type of the primary armament
Displacement	Ship displacement at full combat load (Note: Historian Erich Gröner states that full load was defined as "[equal to] type displacement plus full load fuel oil, diesel oil, coal, reserve boiler feed water, aircraft fuel, and special equipment.")
Propulsion	Number of shafts, type of propulsion system, and top speed generated
Service	The dates work began and finished on the ship and its ultimate fate
Laid down	The date the keel began to be assembled
Commissioned	The date the ship was commissioned

== Schwalbe class ==
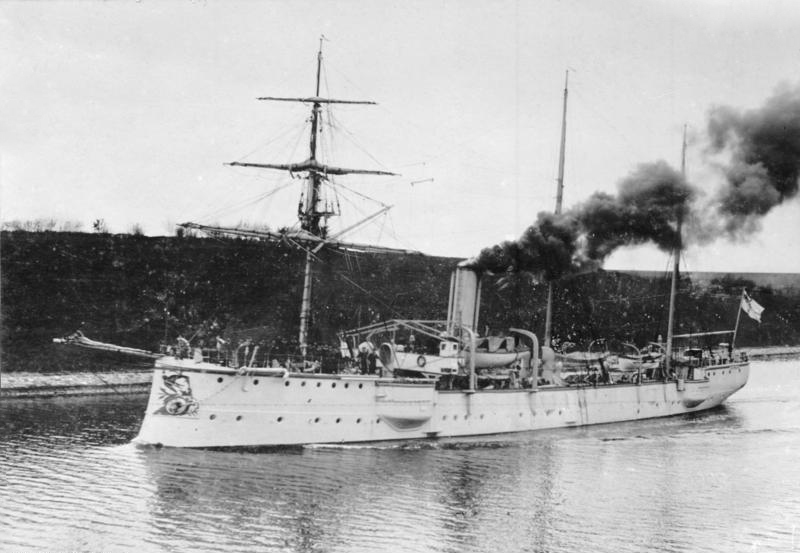
Schwalbe in the Kaiser Wilhelm Canal

Prior to the mid-1880s, the German Kaiserliche Marine (Imperial Navy) had built two types of cruising vessels; small avisos suitable for short-range service with the main fleet, and larger, sail-and-steam-powered screw corvettes that could serve on long-range patrols of the German colonial empire. The first unprotected cruisers of the German fleet, the Schwalbe-class cruisers, were designed in 1886 to replace the motley collection of old sailing ships that Germany then relied upon to patrol the overseas empire. Leo von Caprivi, then the Chief of the Kaiserliche Marine, requested cruisers that had the range to operate abroad, but which also possessed sufficient combat power to be useful in time of war; the old sailing ships so poorly armed that they were ineffective as combat ships. Schwalbe and Sperber were therefore armed with a main battery of eight 10.5-centimeter (4.1 in) guns.

Both ships served abroad for the majority of their careers, primarily in Germany's African colonies and in Asia and the Pacific. Their service lives were generally uneventful, apart from the normal routine of colonial policing. They were both sent to German East Africa to help put down the Abushiri Revolt in 1889–1890, and Schwalbe joined the Eight Nation Alliance against the Boxer Uprising in China in 1900. Both ships were decommissioned by 1911 and were thereafter used for secondary roles: Schwalbe as a training ship and Sperber as a target ship. After World War I, both vessels were sold and broken up for scrap by 1922.

Summary of the Schwalbe class
Ship	Armament	Displacement	Propulsion	Service		
Ship	Armament	Displacement	Propulsion	Laid down	Commissioned	Fate
Schwalbe	8 × 10.5 cm (4.1 in) K L/35 guns	1,359 t (1,338 long tons; 1,498 short tons)	2 × 2-cylinder double-expansion marine steam engines, 13.5 kn (25.0 km/h; 15.5 mph)	April 1886	8 May 1888	Scrapped, 1922
Sperber	8 × 10.5 cm (4.1 in) K L/35 guns	1,359 t (1,338 long tons; 1,498 short tons)	2 × 2-cylinder double-expansion marine steam engines, 13.5 kn (25.0 km/h; 15.5 mph)	September 1887	2 April 1889	Scrapped, 1922

== Bussard class ==
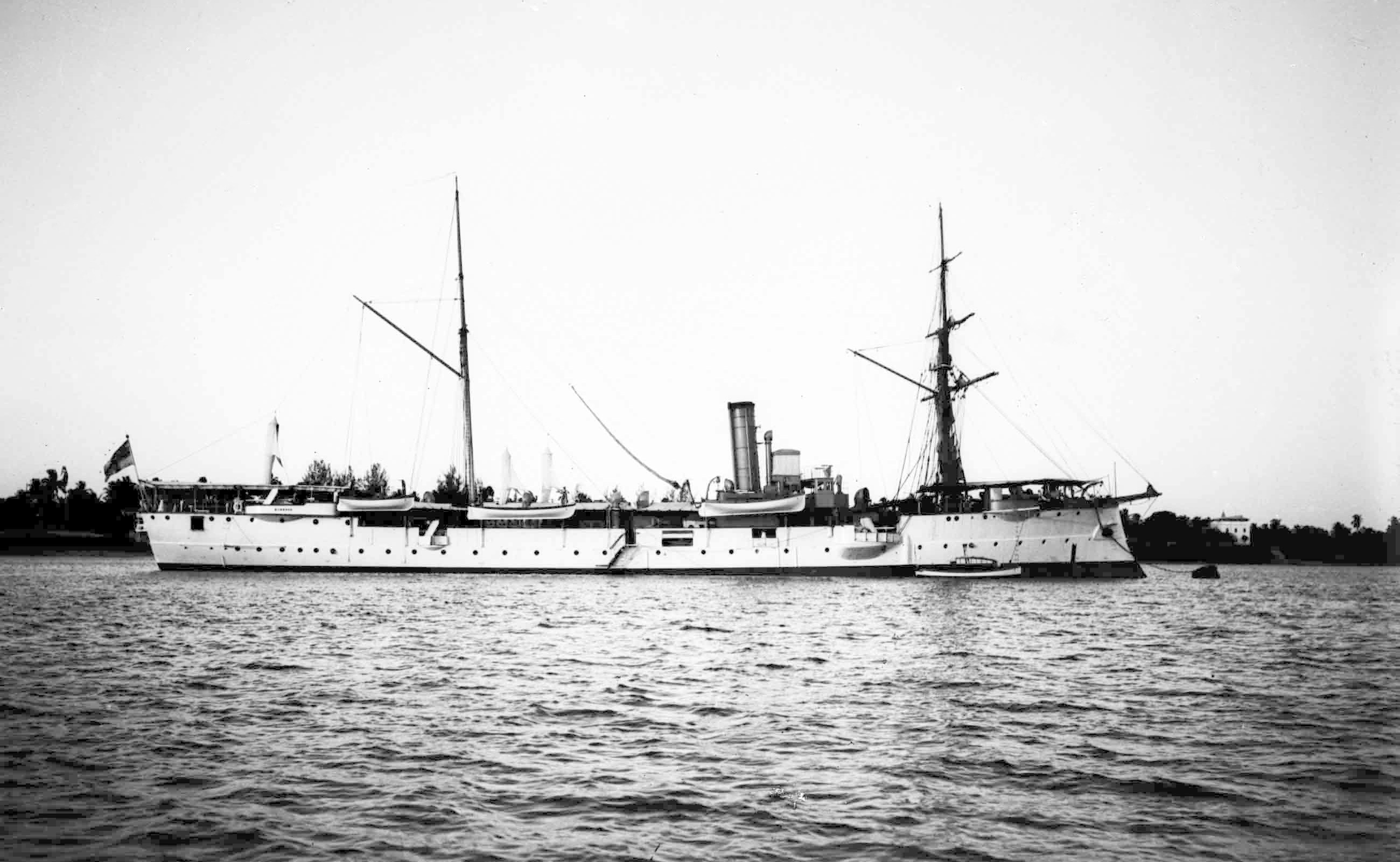
Bussard in Dar es Salaam

The Kaiserliche Marine designed the Bussard class in 1888 as an improved version of the Schwalbe class; like their predecessors, the Bussards were intended purely for colonial duty and were named for birds. They were larger and faster, with a comparable cruising radius and the same number and caliber of guns, though all but the first ship were equipped with new quick-firing models. The Bussard class was also the last cruiser design to incorporate a sailing rig in the German Navy.

All five ships served extensively in Germany's colonial possessions in Africa, Asia, and the Pacific. Seeadler participated in the suppression of the Boxer Uprising in 1900, Falke participated in the Venezuelan crisis of 1902–1903, and Condor and Cormoran helped to defeat the Sokehs Rebellion in the Caroline Islands in 1911. Bussard and Falke were scrapped in 1912, while Seeadler and Condor returned to Germany in 1914 to be decommissioned. Cormoran and Geier remained in the Pacific at the outbreak of World War I; the former's engines were worn out and she was scuttled in Qingdao. Geier briefly attacked British shipping in the Pacific and tried to link up with the main body of Admiral Maximilian von Spee's East Asia Squadron, but put into Hawaii after running out of fuel. She was interned, seized by the US Navy in 1917, and commissioned as USS Schurz; she briefly served in the US Navy before she was accidentally rammed and sunk by a freighter in June 1918. Meanwhile, Seeadler was destroyed by an accidental explosion in 1917. Condor was the only member of the class to survive the war; she was broken up for scrap in 1921.

Summary of the Bussard class
Ship	Armament	Displacement	Propulsion	Service		
Ship	Armament	Displacement	Propulsion	Laid down	Commissioned	Fate
Bussard	8 × 10.5 cm K L/35 guns	1,868 t (1,838 long tons; 2,059 short tons)	2 × 2-cylinder double-expansion steam engines, 15.5 kn (28.7 km/h; 17.8 mph)	1888	7 October 1890	Scrapped, 1913
Falke	8 × 10.5 cm SK L/35 guns	1,868 t (1,838 long tons; 2,059 short tons)	2 × 2-cylinder double-expansion steam engines, 15.5 kn (28.7 km/h; 17.8 mph)	1890	14 September 1891	Scrapped, 1913
Seeadler	8 × 10.5 cm SK L/35 guns	1,868 t (1,838 long tons; 2,059 short tons)	2 × 2-cylinder double-expansion steam engines, 15.5 kn (28.7 km/h; 17.8 mph)	1890	17 August 1892	Destroyed, 19 April 1917
Condor	8 × 10.5 cm SK L/35 guns	1,868 t (1,838 long tons; 2,059 short tons)	2 × 2-cylinder double-expansion steam engines, 15.5 kn (28.7 km/h; 17.8 mph)	1891	9 December 1892	Scrapped, 1921
Cormoran	8 × 10.5 cm SK L/35 guns	1,868 t (1,838 long tons; 2,059 short tons)	2 × 2-cylinder double-expansion steam engines, 15.5 kn (28.7 km/h; 17.8 mph)	1890	25 July 1893	Scuttled, 28 September 1914
Geier	8 × 10.5 cm SK L/35 guns	1,868 t (1,838 long tons; 2,059 short tons)	2 × 2-cylinder double-expansion steam engines, 15.5 kn (28.7 km/h; 17.8 mph)	1893	24 October 1895	Captured, 6 April 1917, sunk 21 June 1918

== Gefion ==
Gefion sometime before 1904

Gefion was the last unprotected cruiser built for the Kaiserliche Marine; she was in fact a smaller version of contemporary protected cruisers like Kaiserin Augusta. The designers attempted to build a hybrid vessel that could serve as a fleet scout and as an overseas cruiser, mainly due to a smaller naval budget, which limited the navy's ability to acquire ships optimized for each role. The resulting design was unsatisfactory, since the requirements for the roles were contradictory. For example, powerful engines necessary for the high top speeds needed in a fleet scout were also very coal hungry, which reduced the ship's endurance; a long cruising radius was mandatory for ships intended to police Germany's far-flung colonial empire, however.

Construction of the ship was extended due to ventilation problems discovered during sea trials, which necessitated lengthy modifications. She spent the first two and a half years in Germany before being deployed to the East Asia Squadron at the end of 1897. She was present during the Boxer Uprising and took part in the Battle of Taku Forts in 1900. Gefion returned to Germany in late 1901, where she was modernized and then placed in reserve. She was to be recommissioned after the start of World War I, but shortages of personnel prevented her return to active service. Instead, she was used as a barracks ship. After the war, she was converted into a freighter and renamed Adolf Sommerfeld, though the conversion was not particularly successful and she was scrapped in 1923.

Summary of the Gefion class
Ship	Armament	Displacement	Propulsion	Service		
Ship	Armament	Displacement	Propulsion	Laid down	Commissioned	Fate
Gefion	10 × 10.5 cm SK L/35 guns	4,275 t (4,207 long tons; 4,712 short tons)	2 × 3-cylinder triple-expansion steam engines, 20.5 kn (38.0 km/h; 23.6 mph)	1892	5 June 1895	Converted to freighter, 1920, scrapped 1923
