= SM U-159 =

History

German Empire
- Name: U-159
- Ordered: February 1917
- Builder: Kaiserliche Werft Danzig
- Launched: 25 May 1918
- Fate: Broken up in 1919

General characteristics
- Class & type: Type U 158 submarine
- Displacement: 811 t (798 long tons) surfaced; 1,034 t (1,018 long tons) submerged
- Length: 71.15 m (233 ft 5 in) (o/a)
- Beam: 6.20 m (20 ft 4 in) (o/a)
- Height: 8.25 m (27 ft 1 in)
- Draught: 3.94 m (12 ft 11 in)
- Installed power: 2 × 2,400 PS (1,765 kW; 2,367 shp) surfaced; 2 × 1,200 PS (883 kW; 1,184 shp) submerged
- Propulsion: 2 shafts, 2 × 1.70 m (5 ft 7 in) propellers
- Speed: 16.0 knots (29.6 km/h; 18.4 mph) surfaced; 9.0 knots (16.7 km/h; 10.4 mph) submerged
- Range: 12,370 nmi (22,910 km; 14,240 mi) at 8 knots (15 km/h; 9.2 mph) surfaced; 55 nmi (102 km; 63 mi) at 5 knots (9.3 km/h; 5.8 mph) submerged
- Test depth: 50 m (164 ft 1 in)
- Complement: 4 officers, 32 enlisted
- Armament: 6 × 50 cm (19.7 in) torpedo tubes (four bow, two stern); 12-16 torpedoes; 1 × 10.5 cm (4.1 in) SK L/45 deck gun

SM U-159 (Note: "SM" stands for "Seiner Majestät" (English: His Majesty's) and combined with the U for Unterseeboot would be translated as His Majesty's Submarine.) was a Type U-158 submarine of the Imperial German Navy, built during the First World War.

SM U-159 was one of six 810-ton boats ordered in February 1917. She was one of two ships built to an improved design developed from the Type U-115 design, along with her sister, SM U-158. They were known as 'Project 25', and had a greatly increased radius of action. Both ships were built at Kaiserliche Werft Danzig, with U-159 being launched on 25 May 1918. The war ended before she could see active service, and she was broken up in 1919.

== Bibliography ==
- Robert Gardiner & Przemysław Budzbon, ed. (1985). Conway's All the World's Fighting Ships 1906-1921. Conway. ISBN 0-85177-245-5.
- Gibson, R. H.; Prendergast, Maurice (2002). The German Submarine War 1914-1918. Periscope Publishing Ltd. ISBN 1-904381-08-1.
- Gröner, Erich; Jung, Dieter; Maass, Martin (1991). U-boats and Mine Warfare Vessels. German Warships 1815–1945. Vol. 2. Translated by Thomas, Keith; Magowan, Rachel. London: Conway Maritime Press. ISBN 0-85177-593-4.
