= German submarine U-158 =

U-158 may refer to one of the following German submarines:

- SM U-158, the lead ship of the Type U 158 submarines; launched in 1918 during World War I; unfinished at the end of the war; broken up incomplete
- German submarine U-158 (1941), a Type IXC submarine that served in World War II until sunk on 30 June 1942
