= List of light cruisers of Germany =

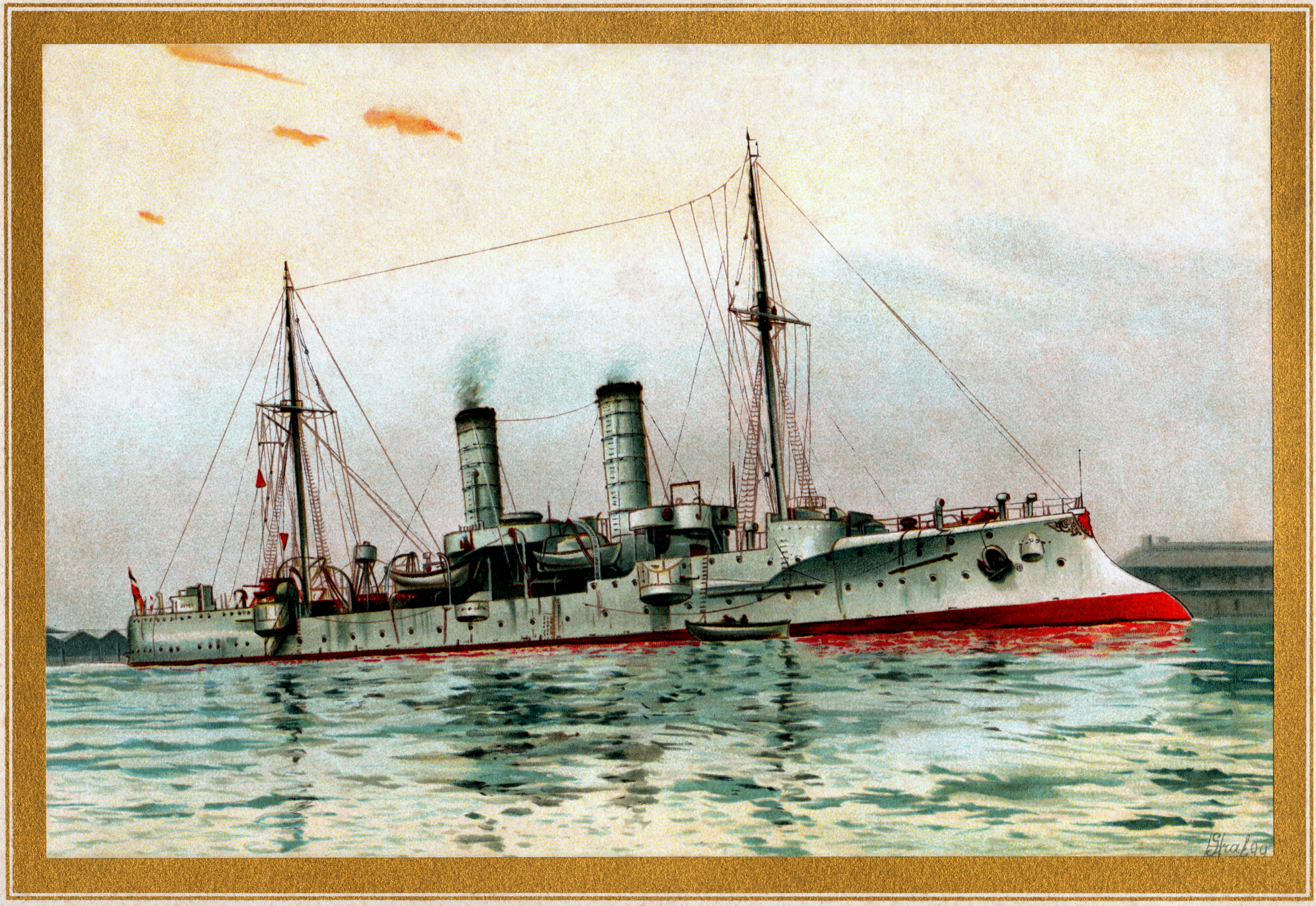
A lithograph of SMS Gazelle, the first modern light cruiser built by Germany

The German navies—specifically the Kaiserliche Marine, Reichsmarine, and Kriegsmarine—built a series of light cruisers between the 1890s and 1940s. The authorization for a major construction program for light cruisers came in the 1898 Naval Law, which ordered the acquisition of thirty vessels of the type. The first such class of light cruiser, the Gazelle class, was based on several intermediate designs of unprotected cruisers, such as the Bussard class, and avisos—dispatch boats—like SMS Hela. The ten members of the Gazelle class set the basic parameters for all later light cruisers of the Kaiserliche Marine. Over the following two decades, the Germans built a further thirty-seven light cruisers; these vessels slowly grew in size, speed, armament, and armor. The original 10.5 cm (4.1 in) SK L/40 gun was replaced by the more advanced L/45 model in the Kolberg class, and it was in turn superseded by the more powerful 15 cm (5.9 in) SK L/45 gun in the Pillau class. A waterline armored belt was introduced in the Magdeburg class, which significantly improved the ships' defensive qualities.

These forty-seven cruisers all saw action across the globe in World War I; the bulk served with the German fleets in the North and Baltic Seas, though several served on foreign stations, typically as commerce raiders. Sixteen cruisers were lost during the war to causes ranging from enemy submarines and naval mines to combat with hostile cruiser squadrons. Most of the survivors were either scuttled in Scapa Flow in June 1919 or seized by the various Allied governments as war prizes following Germany's defeat. Several of these were commissioned into their fleets: Italy received three cruisers and France took four. Germany was permitted to retain eight of the oldest cruisers; of these, five continued to serve in secondary roles into World War II.

The Treaty of Versailles allowed Germany to replace these old cruisers, and the first such new vessel, Emden, was built in the early 1920s to a design based on the last wartime classes. A new approach was taken in the five members of the succeeding Königsberg and Leipzig classes with triple gun turrets and hybrid diesel/turbine propulsion systems. A further six ships of the M class were planned in the late 1930s, but the outbreak of war forced their cancellation. The six cruisers of the Emden, Königsberg, and Leipzig classes all served in World War II, and only one—Nürnberg—survived the war intact. Two were sunk during the invasion of Norway and the remaining three vessels were destroyed by Allied bombers in the final months of the war. Nürnberg, the last cruiser completed by Germany, was seized by the Soviet Union and commissioned as Admiral Makarov, serving until the late 1950s.

Key
Armament	The number and type of the primary armament
Armor	The thickness of the deck armor
Displacement	Ship displacement at full combat load (Note: Historian Erich Gröner states that full load was defined as "[equal to] type displacement plus full load fuel oil, diesel oil, coal, reserve boiler feed water, aircraft fuel, and special equipment.")
Propulsion	Number of shafts, type of propulsion system, and top speed generated
Service	The dates work began and finished on the ship and its ultimate fate
Laid down	The date the keel began to be assembled
Commissioned	The date the ship was commissioned

== Kaiserliche Marine ==
=== Gazelle class ===
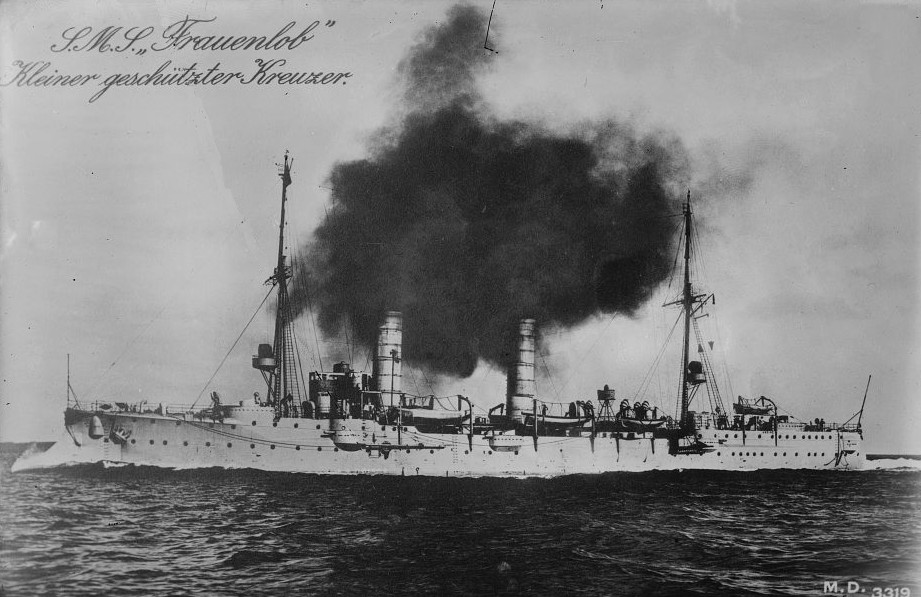
Frauenlob underway before the outbreak of World War I

The Gazelle class was the first modern light cruiser design of the Imperial Navy. This new class of ships was the culmination of earlier unprotected cruisers—the Bussard class—and several experimental intermediate types, such as Gefion and Hela. The Germans intended to use the Gazelles both as fleet scouts and overseas cruisers. Though they were smaller than their foreign contemporaries, they were strongly built and powerfully armed ships for the period. As a result, they could effectively perform the two roles envisioned for the design. According to the historian Eric Osborne, "[t]he light cruisers of the Gazelle-class established a trend for future ships of this general design ... [they] carried little or no armor, the chief asset being speed." Indeed, all future light cruisers built by the Imperial Navy generally followed the same pattern, with few fundamental changes.

The ten ships served in a variety of roles throughout their career. Before the war, most served on foreign stations or with the main fleet, while Nymphe and Undine served as training ships. Due to their age, the Gazelles had been placed in reserve by 1914, but after the outbreak of World War I in August 1914, they were mobilized for active service. Most were initially used as coastal defense vessels in the Baltic, but Frauenlob and Ariadne remained in service with the fleet. Ariadne was sunk by several British battlecruisers at the Battle of Heligoland Bight on 28 August 1914. Frauenlob was torpedoed and sunk by HMS Southampton at the Battle of Jutland on 31 May 1916 with the loss of almost her entire crew. In the Baltic, Undine was torpedoed and sunk by the British submarine HMS E19 on 7 November 1915.

The seven surviving ships were withdrawn from front-line service in 1916 and used for auxiliary purposes. They went on to serve in the new Reichsmarine, with the exception of Gazelle, which was broken up for scrap in 1920. Niobe was sold to Yugoslavia in 1925 and renamed Dalmacija, while Nymphe and Thetis were scrapped in the early 1930s. Arcona, Medusa, and Amazone were used as barracks hulks for the rest of the 1930s. After the outbreak of World War II, Medusa and Arcona were converted into floating anti-aircraft batteries and defended German ports from 1940 to the end of the war, when they were scuttled by their crews on 3 May 1945. Amazone meanwhile remained in service as a barracks ship through the end of the war. Dalmacija eventually returned to German control in 1943, and she was destroyed in December of that year by British Motor Torpedo Boats.

Summary of the Gazelle class
Ship	Armament	Armor	Displacement	Propulsion	Service		
Ship	Armament	Armor	Displacement	Propulsion	Laid down	Commissioned	Fate
Gazelle	10 × 10.5 cm SK L/40 guns	25 mm (0.98 in)	2,963 t (2,916 long tons)	2 shafts, 2 reciprocating engines, 19.5 kn (36.1 km/h; 22.4 mph)	1897	15 June 1901	Scrapped, 1920
Niobe	10 × 10.5 cm SK L/40 guns	25 mm (0.98 in)	2,963 t (2,916 long tons)	2 shafts, 2 reciprocating engines, 21.5 kn (39.8 km/h; 24.7 mph)	1898	25 June 1900	Destroyed, 19 December 1943
Nymphe	10 × 10.5 cm SK L/40 guns	25 mm (0.98 in)	3,017 t (2,969 long tons)	2 shafts, 2 reciprocating engines, 21.5 kn (39.8 km/h; 24.7 mph)	1898	20 September 1900	Scrapped, 1932
Thetis	10 × 10.5 cm SK L/40 guns	25 mm (0.98 in)	3,017 t (2,969 long tons)	2 shafts, 2 reciprocating engines, 21.5 kn (39.8 km/h; 24.7 mph)	1899	14 September 1901	Scrapped, 1930
Ariadne	10 × 10.5 cm SK L/40 guns	25 mm (0.98 in)	3,006 t (2,959 long tons)	2 shafts, 2 reciprocating engines, 21.5 kn (39.8 km/h; 24.7 mph)	1899	18 May 1901	Sunk Battle of Heligoland Bight, 28 August 1914
Amazone	10 × 10.5 cm SK L/40 guns	25 mm (0.98 in)	3,082 t (3,033 long tons)	2 shafts, 2 reciprocating engines, 21.5 kn (39.8 km/h; 24.7 mph)	1899	18 May 1901	Scrapped, 1954
Medusa	10 × 10.5 cm SK L/40 guns	25 mm (0.98 in)	2,972 t (2,925 long tons)	2 shafts, 2 reciprocating engines, 21.5 kn (39.8 km/h; 24.7 mph)	1900	26 July 1901	Scrapped, 1948–1950
Frauenlob	10 × 10.5 cm SK L/40 guns	25 mm (0.98 in)	3,158 t (3,108 long tons)	2 shafts, 2 reciprocating engines, 21.5 kn (39.8 km/h; 24.7 mph)	1901	17 February 1903	Sunk, Battle of Jutland, 31 May 1916
Arcona	10 × 10.5 cm SK L/40 guns	25 mm (0.98 in)	3,180 t (3,130 long tons)	2 shafts, 2 reciprocating engines, 21.5 kn (39.8 km/h; 24.7 mph)	1901	12 May 1903	Scrapped, 1948
Undine	10 × 10.5 cm SK L/40 guns	25 mm (0.98 in)	3,112 t (3,063 long tons)	2 shafts, 2 reciprocating engines, 21.5 kn (39.8 km/h; 24.7 mph)	1901	5 January 1904	Sunk, 7 November 1915

=== Bremen class ===
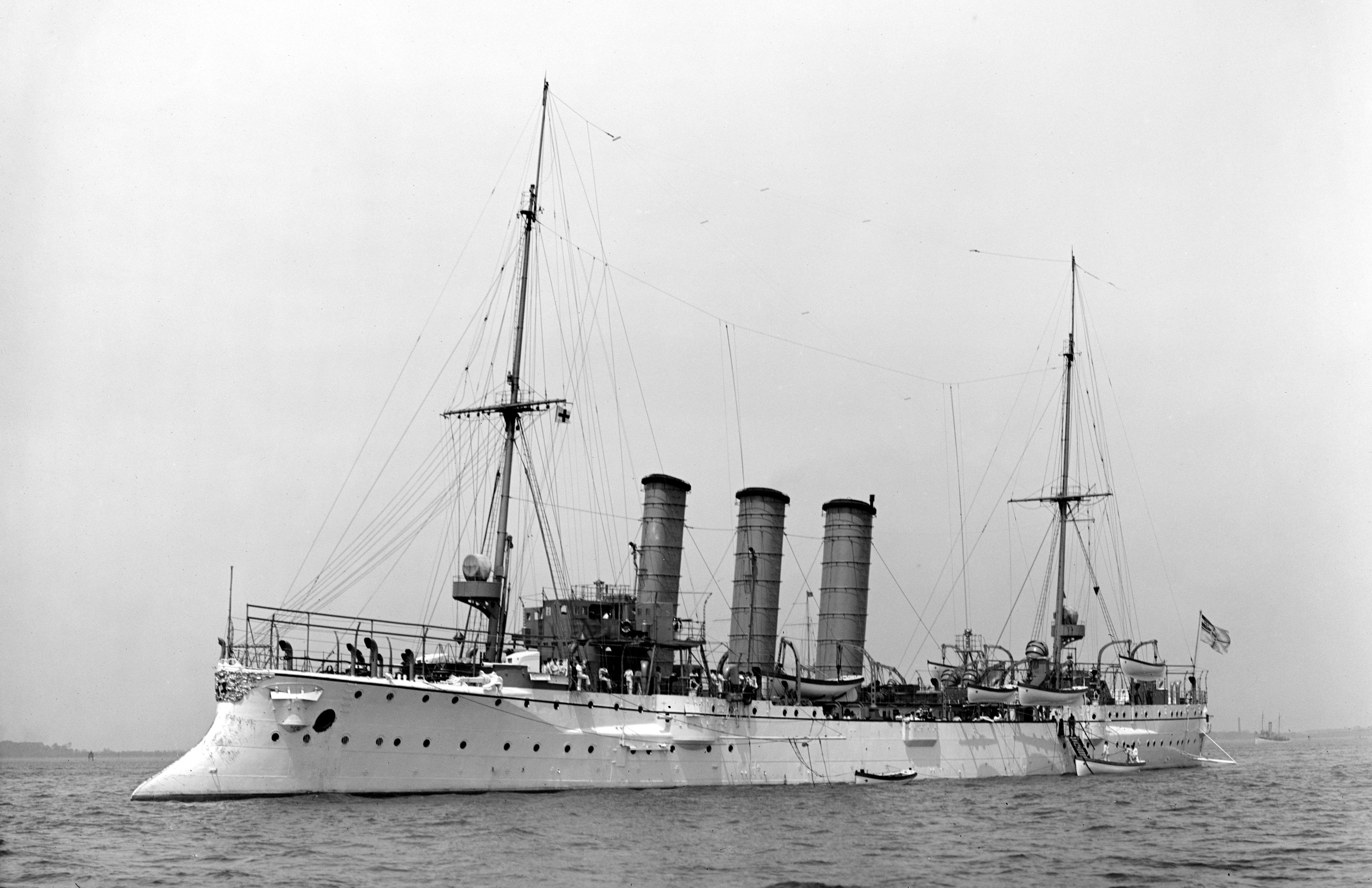
Bremen in the United States in 1907

The Bremen class was an incremental improvement over the earlier Gazelles, being larger and slightly faster. They were otherwise very similar, and mounted the same main battery of 10.5 cm guns. One ship, Lübeck, was fitted with new Parsons steam turbines to evaluate their use in future designs; the other vessels retained proven triple-expansion engines. The ships' peacetime careers saw them serving in several capacities. Bremen and Leipzig served in the East Asia Squadron early in their careers; the other ships, save München, were assigned to the fleet scouting forces. München was used as a torpedo training ship.

The ships saw extensive action during the war. Leipzig fought with the East Asia Squadron at the Battle of Coronel and was sunk at the subsequent Battle of the Falkland Islands in late 1914. München was moderately damaged at Jutland, and Bremen, Lübeck, and Danzig engaged Russian forces at the Battle of the Gulf of Riga and during Operation Albion in 1915 and 1917, respectively. Berlin and München were withdrawn from service in 1916, the latter after being badly damaged by a mine. Only Berlin and Hamburg were retained after the war; the other surviving ships were seized by Britain as war prizes and scrapped in the early 1920s. Both were used as training cruisers in the 1920s and then as barracks ships from the 1930s. Hamburg was sunk by British bombers in 1944 during World War II, and Berlin was loaded with chemical weapons and scuttled in the Skaggerak in 1947 to dispose of the munitions.

Summary of the Bremen class
Ship	Armament	Armor	Displacement	Propulsion	Service		
Ship	Armament	Armor	Displacement	Propulsion	Laid down	Commissioned	Fate
Bremen	10 × 10.5 cm SK L/40 guns	80 mm (3.1 in)	3,797 t (3,737 long tons)	2 shafts, 2 reciprocating engines, 22 kn (41 km/h; 25 mph)	1902	19 May 1904	Sunk, 17 February 1915
Hamburg	10 × 10.5 cm SK L/40 guns	80 mm (3.1 in)	3,651 t (3,593 long tons)	2 shafts, 2 reciprocating engines, 22 kn (41 km/h; 25 mph)	1902	8 March 1904	Scrapped, 1956
Berlin	10 × 10.5 cm SK L/40 guns	80 mm (3.1 in)	3,792 t (3,732 long tons)	2 shafts, 2 reciprocating engines, 22 kn (41 km/h; 25 mph)	1902	4 April 1905	Scuttled, 1947
Lübeck	10 × 10.5 cm SK L/40 guns	80 mm (3.1 in)	3,661 t (3,603 long tons)	4 shafts, 2 steam turbines, 22.5 kn (41.7 km/h; 25.9 mph)	1903	26 April 1906	Scrapped, 1922–1923
München	10 × 10.5 cm SK L/40 guns	80 mm (3.1 in)	3,780 t (3,720 long tons)	2 shafts, 2 reciprocating engines, 22 kn	1903	10 January 1905	Scrapped, 1920
Leipzig	10 × 10.5 cm SK L/40 guns	80 mm (3.1 in)	3,756 t (3,697 long tons)	2 shafts, 2 reciprocating engines, 22 kn	1904	20 April 1906	Sunk, Battle of the Falkland Islands, 8 December 1914
Danzig	10 × 10.5 cm SK L/40 guns	80 mm (3.1 in)	3,783 t (3,723 long tons)	2 shafts, 2 reciprocating engines, 22 kn	1904	1 December 1907	Scrapped, 1922–1923

=== Königsberg class (1905) ===
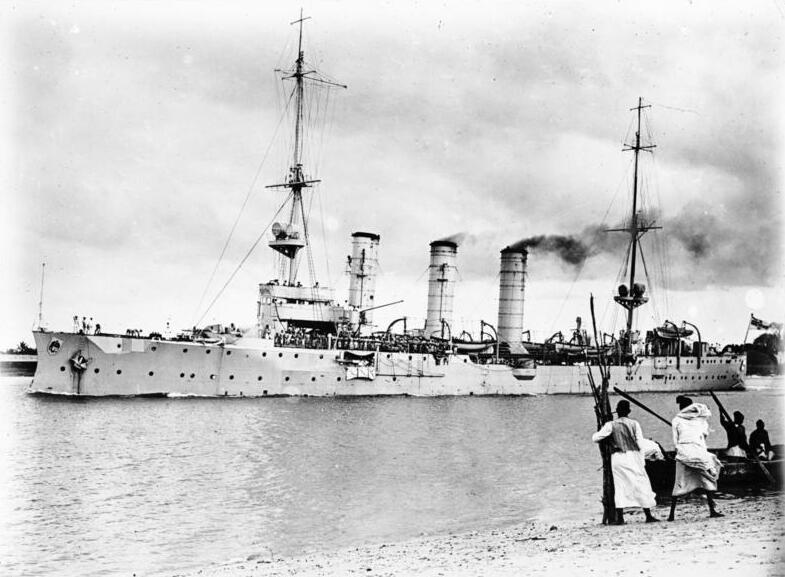
Königsberg in German East Africa

The Königsberg class continued the general trend of slightly larger and faster German light cruiser designs. Like the Bremens, one member of the new class—Stettin—was equipped with turbines for testing purposes. They retained the same armament and armor protection of the Bremen class. All four ships were employed with the High Seas Fleet after they were commissioned, though Nürnberg was deployed to Asia in 1910, and Königsberg was sent to East African waters in 1914.

All four ships saw major action during the war. Königsberg, based in Dar es Salaam at the outbreak of war, began a short and unsuccessful commerce raiding career in the region, though she did destroy the British cruiser HMS Pegasus. She eventually became trapped in the Rufiji River and was later destroyed by a pair of British monitors in 1915. The war was not over for the vessel, however, as her guns were removed and used extensively in Paul von Lettow-Vorbeck's East African Campaign. Nürnberg participated in the battles at Coronel and the Falkland Islands, where she was sunk. Stettin saw action at the Battle of Heligoland Bight in August 1914. Both she and Stuttgart also participated in the Battle of Jutland. Stettin was used as a training ship after 1917, and Stuttgart was converted into a seaplane tender in 1918. Both were seized by Britain as war prizes and scrapped in the early 1920s.

Summary of the Königsberg class
Ship	Armament	Armor	Displacement	Propulsion	Service		
Ship	Armament	Armor	Displacement	Propulsion	Laid down	Commissioned	Fate
Königsberg	10 × 10.5 cm SK L/40 guns	80 mm	3,814 t (3,754 long tons)	2 shafts, 2 reciprocating engines, 23 kn (43 km/h; 26 mph)	1905	6 April 1907	Scuttled, 11 July 1915
Nürnberg	10 × 10.5 cm SK L/40 guns	80 mm	3,902 t (3,840 long tons)	2 shafts, 2 reciprocating engines, 23 kn (43 km/h; 26 mph)	1906	10 April 1908	Sunk, Battle of the Falkland Islands, 8 December 1914
Stuttgart	10 × 10.5 cm SK L/40 guns	80 mm	4,002 t (3,939 long tons)	2 shafts, 2 reciprocating engines, 23 kn (43 km/h; 26 mph)	1905	1 February 1908	Scrapped, 1920
Stettin	10 × 10.5 cm SK L/40 guns	80 mm	3,822 t (3,762 long tons)	2 shafts, 2 steam turbines, 24 kn (44 km/h; 28 mph)	1906	29 October 1907	Scrapped, 1921–1923

=== Dresden class ===
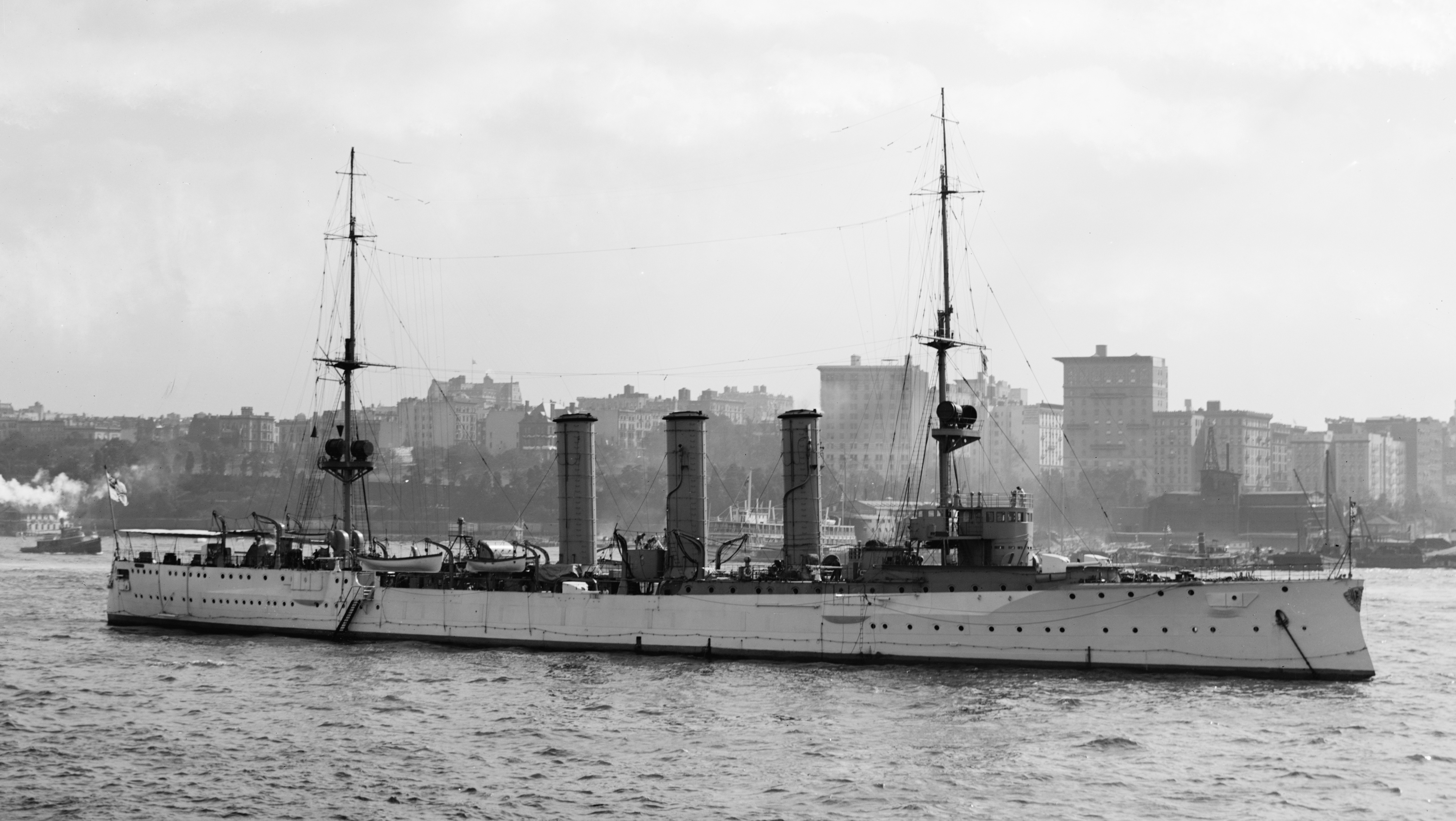
Dresden in New York in 1909

The two cruisers ordered in the 1905–1906 program represented a continuation in the slow, upward trend in displacement, though the two ships had the same top speed as the earlier Königsberg-class ships. Like the preceding classes, one ship was equipped with turbine engines, and one with reciprocating machinery; this was to be the last time a German cruiser utilized the older triple-expansion engines. All subsequent designs adopted steam turbines universally. Dresden and Emden had very active and short careers. Both vessels served on foreign stations for the majority of their careers; Emden was assigned to the East Asia Squadron after she entered service, and Dresden spent much time off the North American Atlantic coast.

Dresden initially operated as a commerce raider in the Atlantic after the outbreak of war in 1914, before steaming around South America to join von Spee's squadron as it approached the continent. She took part in the battles of Coronel and the Falkland Islands, and she was the only German cruiser to escape destruction at the latter. She was later trapped by British cruisers at Más a Tierra in March 1915. After a short bombardment from the British ships, Dresden's crew scuttled her in the harbor. Emden, meanwhile, had been detached from the East Asia Squadron to act as an independent raider in the Indian Ocean. She had a successful career hunting Allied merchant ships in the area, and also sank the Russian protected cruiser Zhemchug in Penang harbor. Shortly thereafter, the Australian light cruiser HMAS Sydney caught Emden off the Cocos Islands and inflicted serious damage, forcing her to beach on the island of North Keeling.

Summary of the Dresden class
Ship	Armament	Armor	Displacement	Propulsion	Service		
Ship	Armament	Armor	Displacement	Propulsion	Laid down	Commissioned	Fate
Dresden	10 × 10.5 cm SK L/40 guns	80 mm	4,268 t (4,201 long tons)	2 shafts, 2 steam turbines, 24 kn	1906	14 November 1908	Scuttled, 14 March 1915
Emden	10 × 10.5 cm SK L/40 guns	80 mm	4,268 t (4,201 long tons)	2 shafts, 2 reciprocating engines, 23.5 kn (43.5 km/h; 27.0 mph)	1906	20 July 1909	Grounded, Battle of Cocos, 9 November 1914

=== Kolberg class ===
Illustration of Mainz by Oscar Parkes, 1910

The Kolberg class represented the first major improvement in combat power for German light cruisers, both qualitatively and quantitatively. They were armed with the longer-barrel 10.5 cm SK L/45 gun, which had a higher muzzle velocity and thus greater range than the earlier L/40 weapon. In addition, they carried an extra pair of guns, which strengthened their broadside. This was on a displacement of over a thousand tons greater than the preceding Dresden class. All four ships were also powered by turbines, which granted them a significant increase in speed over the earlier vessels.

All four ships saw major action during the war. Augsburg fired the first shots of the war against Russia on 2 August. Mainz and Cöln were sunk at the Battle of Heligoland Bight in the first month of the war. Kolberg saw action at the Battle of Dogger Bank in January 1915 and scored the first hits of the engagement. Both Kolberg and Augsburg participated in the Battle of the Gulf of Riga in August 1915, and Operation Albion in October 1917. After the end of the war, Kolberg was seized by France as a war prize and commissioned into the French Navy as Colmar; she served for only a few years and was scrapped in 1929. Augsburg was surrendered to Japan, which broke her up for scrap in 1922.

Summary of the Kolberg class
Ship	Armament	Armor	Displacement	Propulsion	Service		
Ship	Armament	Armor	Displacement	Propulsion	Laid down	Commissioned	Fate
Kolberg	12 × 10.5 cm SK L/45 guns	40 mm (1.6 in)	5,418 t (5,332 long tons)	4 shafts, 4 steam turbines, 25.5 kn (47.2 km/h; 29.3 mph)	1908	21 June 1910	Scrapped, 1929
Mainz	12 × 10.5 cm SK L/45 guns	40 mm (1.6 in)	4,889 t (4,812 long tons)	2 shafts, 2 steam turbines, 26 kn (48 km/h; 30 mph)	1907	1 October 1909	Sunk, Battle of Heligoland Bight, 28 August 1914
Cöln	12 × 10.5 cm SK L/45 guns	40 mm (1.6 in)	4,864 t (4,787 long tons)	4 shafts, 4 steam turbines, 25.5 kn	1908	16 June 1911	Sunk, Battle of Heligoland Bight, 28 August 1914
Augsburg	12 × 10.5 cm SK L/45 guns	40 mm (1.6 in)	4,882 t (4,805 long tons)	4 shafts, 4 steam turbines, 25.5 kn	1908	1 October 1910	Scrapped, 1922

=== Magdeburg class ===
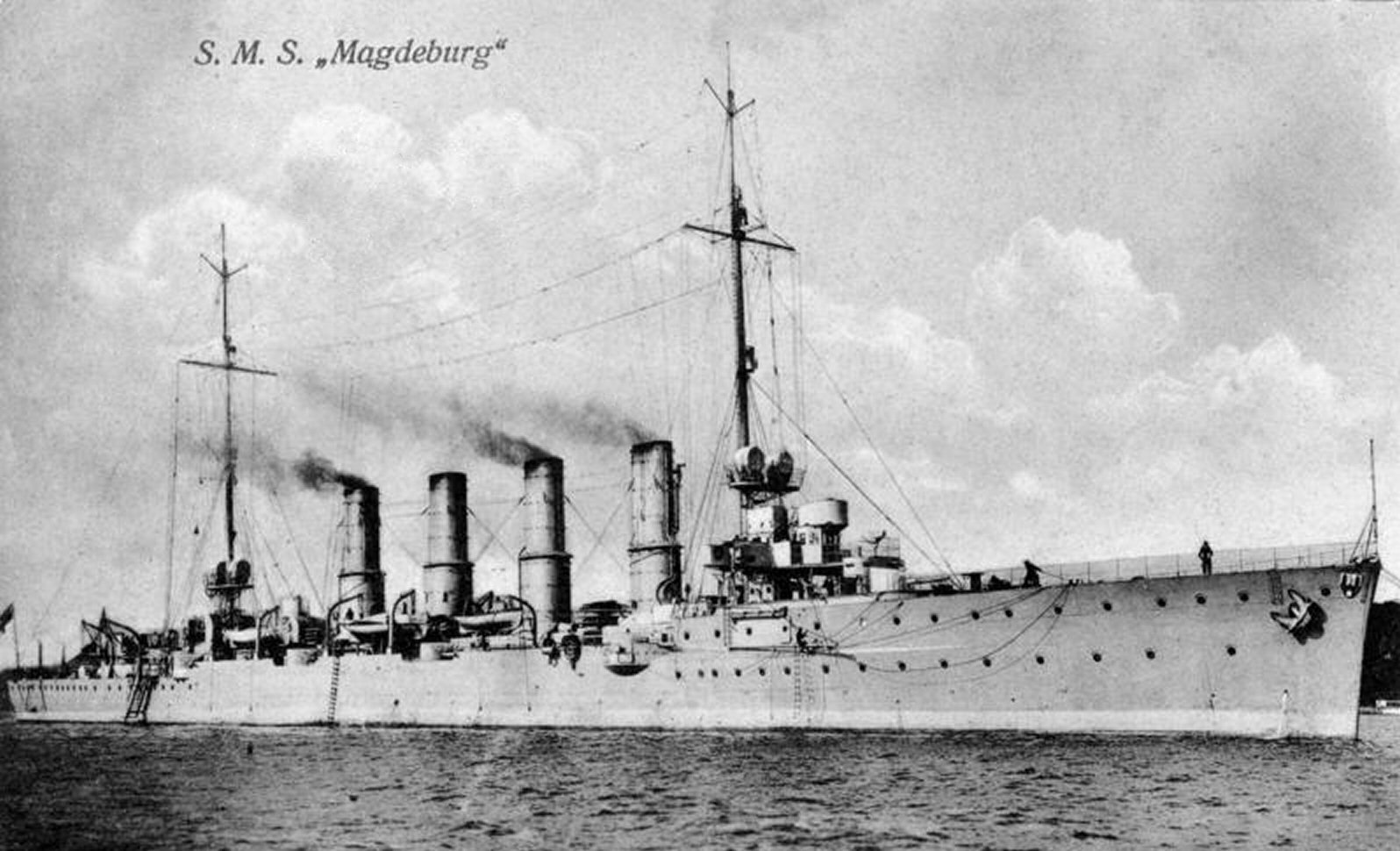
Magdeburg in 1912

The Magdeburg class introduced several significant improvements over earlier designs, including a more effective bow shape that improved seakeeping and a cut-down quarterdeck that allowed for more efficient handling of the ships' mines. Perhaps most importantly, a waterline armored belt was added to improve the defensive capabilities of the new ships. They also had much more powerful turbines, and as a result, a higher top speed. All following light cruisers adopted these innovations.

Magdeburg's career was cut short on 26 August 1914, when she ran aground while operating against Russian forces in the Baltic. The Russians seized code books from the wreck and gave copies to the British; this was to have a major effect on the outcome of the naval war in the North Sea. Breslau was assigned to the Mediterranean Division along with the battlecruiser Goeben; at the outbreak of war, they steamed to Constantinople where they were sold to the Ottoman Navy. They were instrumental in bringing the Ottoman Empire into the war on the side of Germany. Breslau, renamed Midilli, was eventually sunk by British mines during the Battle of Imbros in January 1918.

The other two ships, Strassburg and Stralsund, remained with the High Seas Fleet for the duration of their careers. They saw action at the major engagements, including Heligoland Bight and Dogger Bank, though neither ship was present at Jutland. Both ships survived the war; Strassburg was surrendered to Italy and renamed Taranto. She served through World War II and was sunk by Allied bombers in 1944. Stralsund became the French Mulhouse, though she served for only a few years and was withdrawn from service by 1925 and scrapped a decade later.

Summary of the Magdeburg class
Ship	Armament	Armor	Displacement	Propulsion	Service		
Ship	Armament	Armor	Displacement	Propulsion	Laid down	Commissioned	Fate
Magdeburg	12 × 10.5 cm SK L/45 guns	60 mm (2.4 in)	4,570 t (4,498 long tons)	3 shafts, 3 steam turbines, 27.5 kn (50.9 km/h; 31.6 mph)	1910	20 August 1912	Grounded, 26 August 1914
Breslau	12 × 10.5 cm SK L/45 guns	60 mm (2.4 in)	5,281 t (5,198 long tons)	4 shafts, 2 steam turbines, 27.5 kn	1910	10 May 1912	Sunk, Battle of Imbros, 20 January 1918
Strassburg	12 × 10.5 cm SK L/45 guns	60 mm (2.4 in)	5,281 t (5,198 long tons)	2 shafts, 2 steam turbines, 27.5 kn	1910	9 October 1912	Sunk, 23 September 1944
Stralsund	12 × 10.5 cm SK L/45 guns	60 mm (2.4 in)	5,587 t (5,499 long tons)	3 shafts, 3 steam turbines, 27.5 kn	1910	10 December 1912	Scrapped, 1935

=== Karlsruhe class ===
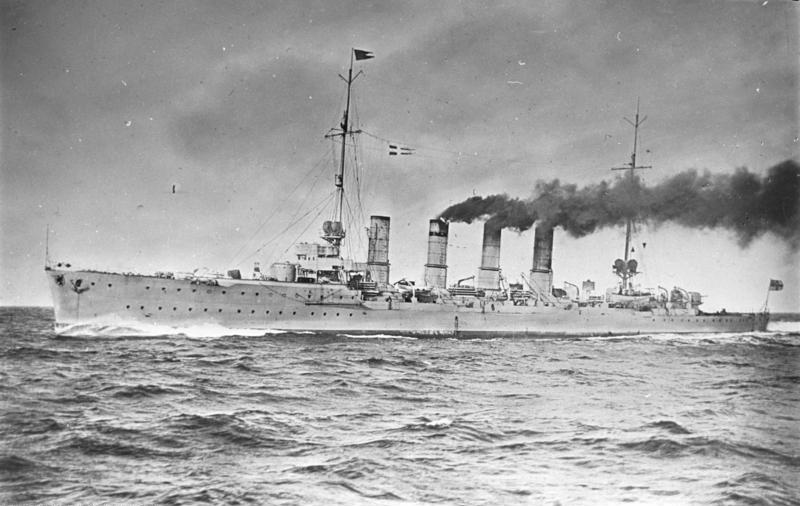
Karlsruhe underway

These two ships were a minor improvement over the Magdeburg class. They were significantly larger, slightly faster, and had a more raked hull, but carried the same main battery and had identical armor protection. They were also the last cruisers to enter service before the outbreak of World War I. Karlsruhe was assigned to replace Dresden in the Caribbean in mid-1914, and shortly after her arrival in late July 1914, hostilities opened in Europe. Karlsruhe thereafter operated as a commerce raider; she captured or sank some sixteen ships off the coast of Brazil before an accidental explosion destroyed the ship and killed most of her crew.

Rostock, meanwhile, remained with the High Seas Fleet. She saw action at Dogger Bank, the bombardment of Yarmouth and Lowestoft in April 1916, and at Jutland the following month. There, she assisted in the destruction of a pair of British destroyers. In the ferocious night fighting on the night of 31 May – 1 June, Rostock was torpedoed and disabled by British destroyers. The following morning, she was scuttled to avoid capture when the British cruiser HMS Dublin arrived on the scene.

Summary of the Karlsruhe class
Ship	Armament	Armor	Displacement	Propulsion	Service		
Ship	Armament	Armor	Displacement	Propulsion	Laid down	Commissioned	Fate
Karlsruhe	12 × 10.5 cm SK L/45 guns	60 mm	6,191 t (6,093 long tons)	2 shafts, 2 steam turbines, 28 kn (52 km/h; 32 mph)	21 September 1911	15 January 1914	Sunk, 4 November 1914
Rostock	12 × 10.5 cm SK L/45 guns	60 mm	6,191 t (6,093 long tons)	2 shafts, 2 steam turbines, 28 kn (52 km/h; 32 mph)	1911	5 February 1914	Sunk, Battle of Jutland, 1 June 1916

=== Graudenz class ===
Illustration of Regensburg showing the arrangement of the armament and armor

The Graudenz-class cruisers were very similar to the preceding Karlsruhe class, being of similar size, mounting an identical main battery, and having a comparable speed. They could be visually differentiated by the number of funnels; Graudenz and Regensburg returned to the three-funnel arrangement of the earlier light cruisers. Both ships served in the reconnaissance forces of the High Seas Fleet. Graudenz was present during the raid on Scarborough, Hartlepool and Whitby in December 1914 and the Battle of the Gulf of Riga in August 1915. She was damaged by a mine in mid-1916, and was in dock for repairs during Jutland. Regensburg was present for the battle, where she led the torpedo boat flotillas screening the I Scouting Group battlecruisers. She emerged from the battle completely undamaged, despite having led several torpedo attacks against British formations.

Both ships survived the war. Graudenz became the Italian Ancona and served until 1937, when she was sold for scrapping. Regensburg was surrendered to France and commissioned as Strasbourg; she served in the French fleet until 1936, when she was reduced to a barracks ship. She served in this capacity through the German occupation of the country, and was eventually scuttled to protect the U-boat pens in Lorient in 1944.

Summary of the Graudenz class
Ship	Armament	Armor	Displacement	Propulsion	Service		
Ship	Armament	Armor	Displacement	Propulsion	Laid down	Commissioned	Fate
Graudenz	12 × 10.5 cm SK L/45 guns	60 mm	6,382 t (6,281 long tons)	2 shafts, 2 steam turbines, 27.5 kn	1912	10 August 1914	Scrapped, 1937
Regensburg	12 × 10.5 cm SK L/45 guns	60 mm	6,382 t (6,281 long tons)	2 shafts, 2 steam turbines, 27.5 kn	1912	3 January 1915	Scuttled, 1944

=== Pillau class ===
Pillau, c. 1914–1916

The two Pillau-class ships were originally ordered by the Russian Navy under the names Maraviev Amurskyy and Admiral Nevelskoy; they were approaching completion when war broke out in August 1914. The German navy therefore seized the ships and completed them as Pillau and Elbing. They were the first completed German light cruisers armed with 15 cm (6 in) guns, which marked a significant increase in their combat power. But since they were built originally for the Russians, they lacked the belt armor that had become standard in German cruiser designs. Pillau took part in the Battle of the Gulf of Riga, and both ships were heavily engaged at Jutland. Elbing was accidentally rammed and disabled by the battleship Posen in the confused night fighting, and her crew was ultimately forced to abandon the wreck. Pillau survived the war and was ceded to Italy; she was commissioned as Bari and served into World War II until she was sunk by American bombers in 1943.

Summary of the Pillau class
Ship	Armament	Armor	Displacement	Propulsion	Service		
Ship	Armament	Armor	Displacement	Propulsion	Laid down	Commissioned	Fate
Pillau	8 × 15 cm (5.9 in) SK L/45 guns	80 mm	5,252 t (5,169 long tons)	2 shafts, 2 steam turbines, 27.5 kn	1913	14 December 1914	Ceded to Italy, 20 July 1920
Elbing	8 × 15 cm (5.9 in) SK L/45 guns	80 mm	5,252 t (5,169 long tons)	2 shafts, 2 steam turbines, 27.5 kn	1913	4 September 1915	Scuttled, 1 June 1916

=== Wiesbaden class ===
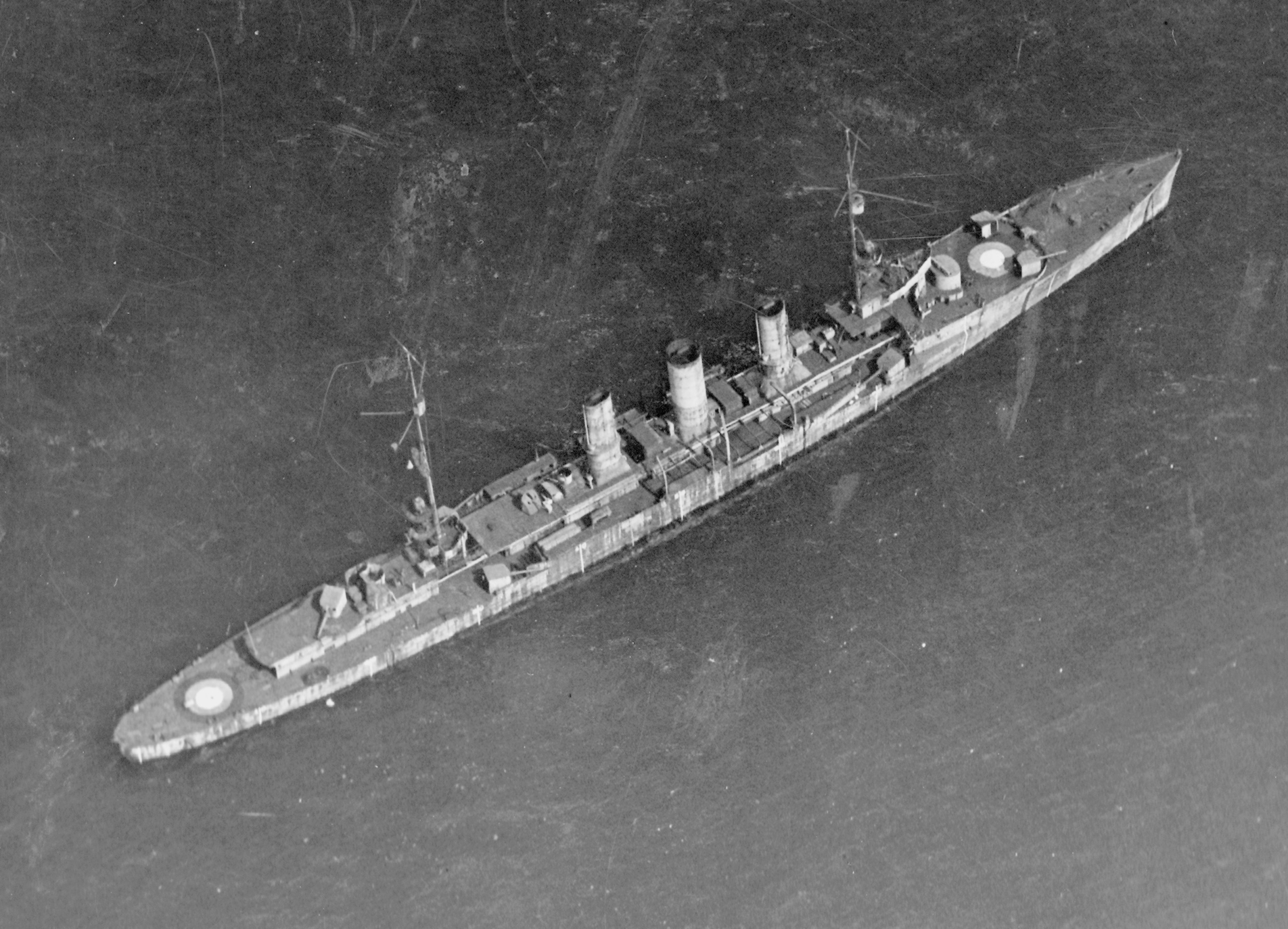
Frankfurt as a target ship in US Navy service

The Wiesbaden class was the first German light cruiser design to mount 15 cm guns, though the Pillau class was completed with guns of this caliber first. The Wiesbaden-class ships were otherwise very similar to the preceding Graudenz class; they were slightly larger, but had the same speed and identical armor protection.

Wiesbaden only participated in one major battle: Jutland. Early in the engagement, the ship was badly damaged by gunfire from the battlecruiser HMS Invincible. Immobilized between the two battle fleets, Wiesbaden became the center of a hard-fought action that saw the destruction of two British armored cruisers. Wiesbaden remained afloat until the early hours of 1 June and sank sometime between 01:45 and 02:45. Frankfurt was also present at Jutland, where she traded blows with HMS Chester. She also saw action during Operation Albion in October 1917, and the Second Battle of Heligoland Bight in November of that year. Frankfurt survived the war and was interned at Scapa Flow; her crew was unsuccessful in their attempt to scuttle her, and she was ultimately surrendered to the United States and expended as a target in 1921.

Summary of the Wiesbaden class
Ship	Armament	Armor	Displacement	Propulsion	Service		
Ship	Armament	Armor	Displacement	Propulsion	Laid down	Commissioned	Fate
Wiesbaden	8 × 15 cm SK L/45 guns	60 mm	6,601 t (6,497 long tons)	2 shafts, 2 steam turbines, 27.5 kn	1913	23 August 1915	Sunk, 1 June 1916
Frankfurt	8 × 15 cm SK L/45 guns	60 mm	6,601 t (6,497 long tons)	2 shafts, 2 steam turbines, 27.5 kn	1913	20 August 1915	Sunk as a target, 18 July 1921

=== Königsberg class (1915) ===
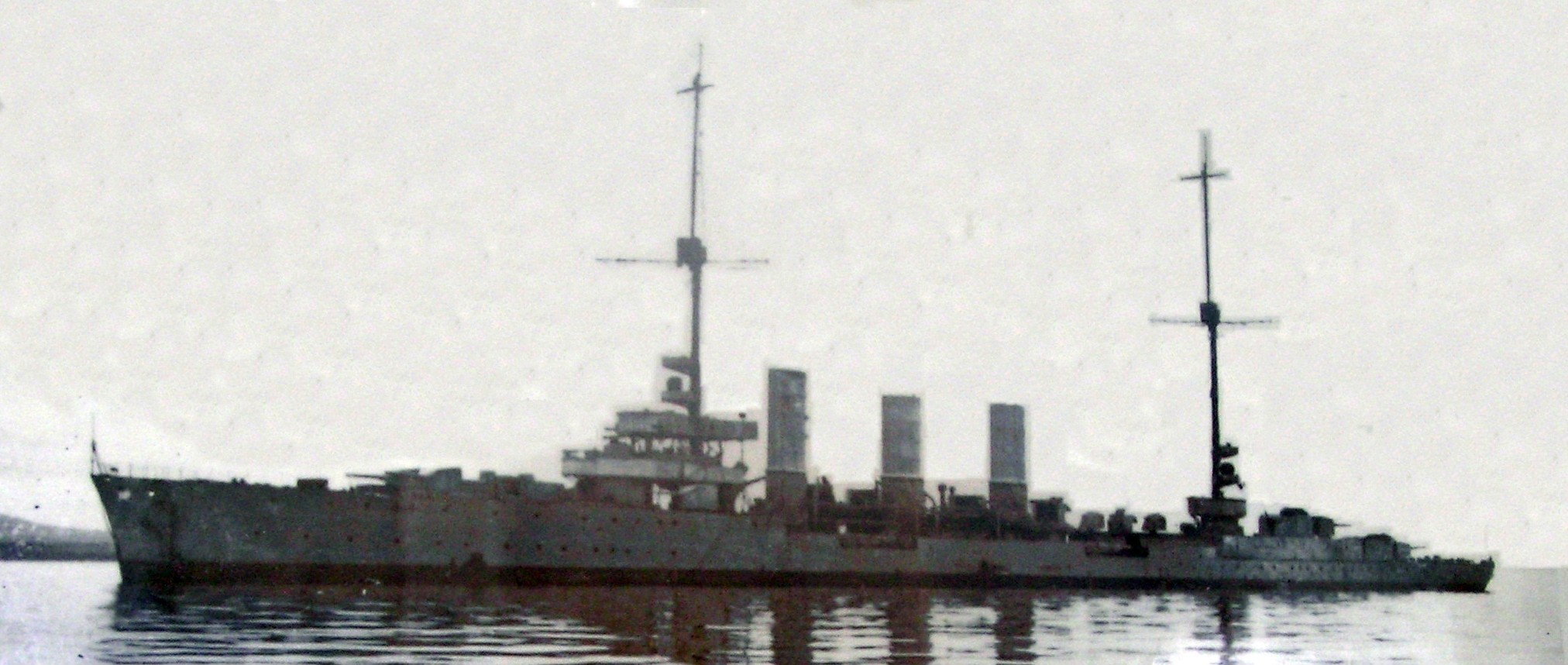
Karlsruhe in Scapa Flow in 1919

The second Königsberg class was authorized in 1913 and laid down starting in 1914. They were named for cruisers that had been sunk in the early months of the war. They were an incremental improvement over the Wiesbaden class, being some five hundred tons heavier. They carried the standard eight 15 cm guns, the forward wing mounts were placed a deck higher to improve their firing arc. They were otherwise identical to the preceding light cruiser designs.

Königsberg and Nürnberg both saw action at the Second Battle of Heligoland Bight, where the former was slightly damaged. All four members of the class participated in Operation Albion in the Baltic. The cruisers, save Emden, were also assigned to the planned final fleet action in October 1918, but mutiny among the German capital ships forced the cancellation of the plan. Karlsruhe, Emden, and Nürnberg were interned with the fleet in Scapa Flow, while Königsberg remained in Germany. The three cruisers were scuttled, though only Karlsruhe actually sank. Emden and Nürnberg were beached by British sailors and were seized as war prizes by France and Britain, respectively. Emden was scrapped in 1926 and Nürnberg was sunk as a target in 1922. Königsberg, meanwhile, was surrendered to France in 1920 and renamed Metz; she was ultimately scrapped in 1936.

Summary of the Königsberg class
Ship	Armament	Armor	Displacement	Propulsion	Service		
Ship	Armament	Armor	Displacement	Propulsion	Laid down	Commissioned	Fate
Königsberg	8 × 15 cm SK L/45 guns	60 mm	7,125 t (7,012 long tons)	2 shafts, 2 steam turbines, 28 kn	1914	12 August 1916	Scrapped, 1936
Karlsruhe	8 × 15 cm SK L/45 guns	60 mm	7,125 t (7,012 long tons)	2 shafts, 2 steam turbines, 28 kn	1915	15 November 1916	Scuttled, 21 June 1919
Emden	8 × 15 cm SK L/45 guns	60 mm	7,125 t (7,012 long tons)	2 shafts, 2 steam turbines, 28 kn	1914	16 December 1916	Scrapped, 1926
Nürnberg	8 × 15 cm SK L/45 guns	60 mm	7,125 t (7,012 long tons)	2 shafts, 2 steam turbines, 28 kn	1915	15 February 1917	Sunk as a target ship, 1922

=== Brummer class ===
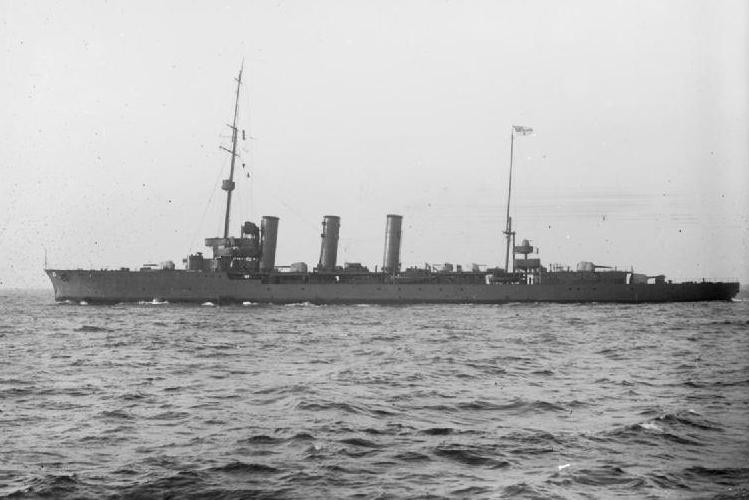
Brummer arriving in Rosyth at the end of World War I

The two Brummer class cruisers were designed in 1914, when the turbines being built by AG Vulcan for the Russian light cruiser Svetlana became available owing to the state of war between Germany and Russia. The German navy instructed AG Vulcan to divide the turbines in half and design a pair of cruiser-minelayers around the propulsion system. (Note: A long-standing myth surrounds the origins of the turbines for the Brummer class. Many authors have repeated the claim that the turbines in question had been ordered for the Borodino-class battlecruiser Navarin, but according to the historians Dodson & Nottelmann, this is impossible from an engineering standpoint, as Navarin received Parsons style turbines, which used sets of high- and low-pressure turbines to drive different screw propellers, which would have been impossible to divide between two ships. They point out that the Brummers received Curtis-style turbines, which combined high- and low-pressure turbines on each propeller shaft. Moreover, according to surviving records, Dodson & Nottelmann point out that Navarin's turbines had been ordered from the Franco-Russian Works in Saint Petersburg, not AG Vulcan.) As a result of their need for high speed, they were lightly armed, with only four 15 cm guns. And to further aid them in their offensive minelaying role, they were designed to resemble British cruisers to help conceal their identity.

Brummer and Bremse typically operated together throughout the war. They participated in numerous minelaying operations in 1916 and 1917. The two cruisers devastated a British convoy to Norway in October 1917, sinking the two escorting destroyers and most of the transports. Both were interned at Scapa Flow at the end of the war; they were successfully scuttled in June 1919. Brummer remains on the bottom of the harbor, but Bremse was raised for scrapping in 1929 and broken up in the early 1930s.

Summary of the Brummer class
Ship	Armament	Armor	Displacement	Propulsion	Service		
Ship	Armament	Armor	Displacement	Propulsion	Laid down	Commissioned	Fate
Brummer	4 × 15 cm SK L/45 guns	15 mm (0.59 in)	5,856 t (5,764 long tons)	2 shafts, 2 steam turbines, 28 kn	1915	2 April 1916	Scuttled, 21 June 1919
Bremse	4 × 15 cm SK L/45 guns	15 mm (0.59 in)	5,856 t (5,764 long tons)	2 shafts, 2 steam turbines, 28 kn	1915	1 July 1916	Scuttled, 21 June 1919

=== Cöln class ===
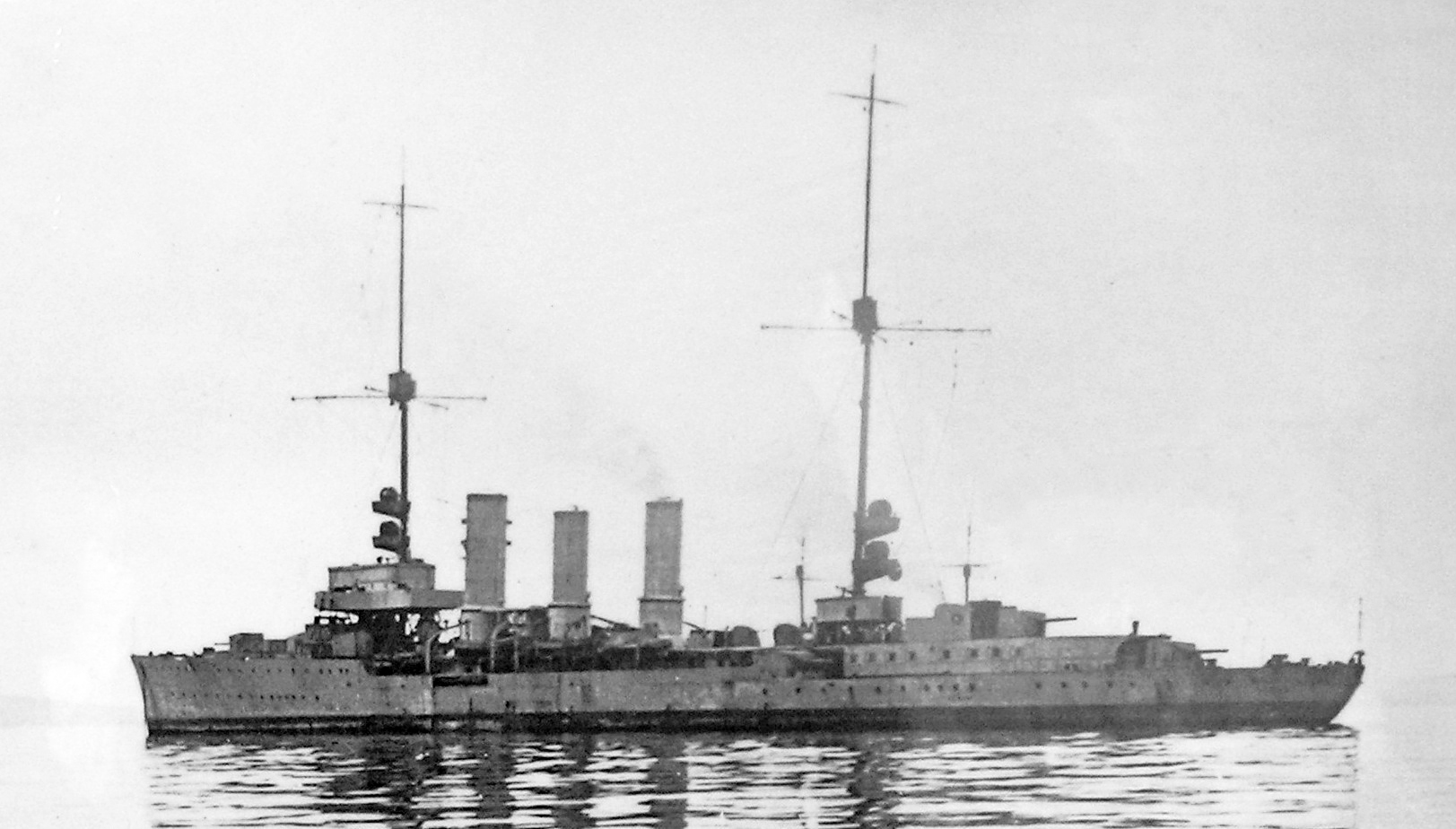
Cöln in Scapa Flow in 1919

By 1916, Germany had lost thirteen light cruisers in the conflict; ten new light cruisers were ordered to a design based on the preceding Königsberg class. The new, larger design added a third 8.8 cm (3.5 in) anti-aircraft gun, along with much more powerful 60 cm (24 in) torpedo tubes, compared to the 50 cm (20 in) type used in earlier classes. They were otherwise very similar, with the same top speed and armor protection.

Only two ships of the ten were completed: Cöln and Dresden. Five other ships were launched, but not completed—these ships received names—and the remaining three had only had some work done to their keels before work ceased. These latter three ships were known only by their contract names. Cöln and Dresden had very limited careers, since they were completed so late in the war. They both participated in a fleet sortie into the northern North Sea that attempted to intercept a heavily escorted convoy from Britain to Norway. And they were assigned to the abortive final sortie in October 1918. Both cruisers were interned in Scapa Flow and scuttled there in June 1919, and both remain on the bottom of Scapa Flow.

Summary of the Cöln class
Ship	Armament	Armor	Displacement	Propulsion	Service		
Ship	Armament	Armor	Displacement	Propulsion	Laid down	Commissioned	Fate
Cöln	8 × 15 cm SK L/45 guns	40 mm (1.6 in)	7,486 t (7,368 long tons)	2 shafts, 2 steam turbines, 27.5 kn	1915	17 January 1918	Scuttled, 21 June 1919
Dresden	8 × 15 cm SK L/45 guns	40 mm (1.6 in)	7,486 t (7,368 long tons)	2 shafts, 2 steam turbines, 27.5 kn	1916	28 March 1918	Scuttled, 21 June 1919
Wiesbaden	8 × 15 cm SK L/45 guns	40 mm (1.6 in)	7,486 t (7,368 long tons)	2 shafts, 2 steam turbines, 27.5 kn	1915	—	Scrapped, 1920
Magdeburg	8 × 15 cm SK L/45 guns	40 mm (1.6 in)	7,486 t (7,368 long tons)	2 shafts, 2 steam turbines, 27.5 kn	1916	—	Scrapped, 1922
Leipzig	8 × 15 cm SK L/45 guns	40 mm (1.6 in)	7,486 t (7,368 long tons)	2 shafts, 2 steam turbines, 27.5 kn	1915	—	Scrapped, 1921
Rostock	8 × 15 cm SK L/45 guns	40 mm (1.6 in)	7,486 t (7,368 long tons)	2 shafts, 2 steam turbines, 27.5 kn	1915	—	Scrapped, 1921
Frauenlob	8 × 15 cm SK L/45 guns	40 mm (1.6 in)	7,486 t (7,368 long tons)	2 shafts, 2 steam turbines, 27.5 kn	1915	—	Scrapped, 1921
Ersatz Cöln	8 × 15 cm SK L/45 guns	40 mm (1.6 in)	7,486 t (7,368 long tons)	2 shafts, 2 steam turbines, 27.5 kn	1916	—	Scrapped, 1921
Ersatz Emden	8 × 15 cm SK L/45 guns	40 mm (1.6 in)	7,486 t (7,368 long tons)	2 shafts, 2 steam turbines, 27.5 kn	1916	—	Scrapped, 1921
Ersatz Karlsruhe	8 × 15 cm SK L/45 guns	40 mm (1.6 in)	7,486 t (7,368 long tons)	2 shafts, 2 steam turbines, 27.5 kn	1916	—	Scrapped, 1920

=== FK designs ===
The German navy proposed a series of fleet cruiser designs—designated Flottenkreuzer—in 1916 to follow the Cöln class. The design, which emphasized the reconnaissance role and high speed over combat power, was based on the British C-class cruisers at the request of Kaiser Wilhelm II. As a result, the initial design was much smaller than the Cöln design, and it carried only five 15 cm guns, but had a top speed of 32 knots (59 km/h; 37 mph). Four modified designs followed, with each one increasing in size and armament, until the final design, "FK 4", had returned to the size and armament of the earlier light cruisers. They were design studies only, and Germany's deteriorating wartime situation in the final two years of the war forced the Navy to all but abandon construction of surface warships in favor of U-boats.

Summary of the FK designs
Ship	Armament	Armor	Displacement	Propulsion	Service		
Ship	Armament	Armor	Displacement	Propulsion	Laid down	Commissioned	Fate
FK 1	5 × 15 cm SK L/45 guns	—	3,800 t (3,740 long tons)	2 shafts, 2 steam turbines, 32 kn (59 km/h; 37 mph)	—	—	Design study only
FK 1a	5 × 15 cm SK L/45 guns	—	4,850 t (4,773 long tons)	2 shafts, 2 steam turbines, 33 kn (61 km/h; 38 mph)	—	—	Design study only
FK 2	5 × 15 cm SK L/45 guns	—	5,350 t (5,266 long tons)	2 shafts, 2 steam turbines, 32 kn	—	—	Design study only
FK 3	7 × 15 cm SK L/45 guns	—	6,900 t (6,791 long tons)	2 shafts, 2 steam turbines, 32 kn	—	—	Design study only
FK 4	8 × 15 cm SK L/45 guns	—	8,650 t (8,513 long tons)	2 shafts, 2 steam turbines, 32 kn	—	—	Design study only

== Reichsmarine and Kriegsmarine ==
=== Emden ===
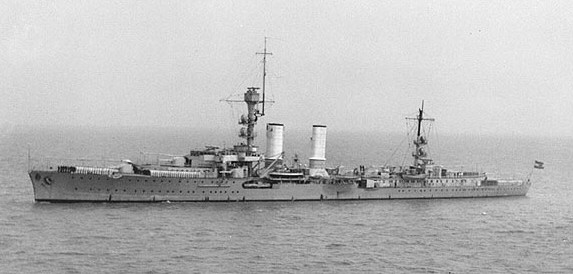
Emden in China in 1931

Emden was the first new cruiser designed by the re-formed Reichsmarine in the early 1920s. According to the terms of the Treaty of Versailles, new designs could only be 6,000 long tons (6,100 t). The design borrowed heavily from the late-World War I cruisers. Though the Germans wanted to use twin gun turrets for the ship's main battery of 15 cm guns, the Naval Inter-Allied Commission of Control rejected the design and forced the designers to adopt single turrets in order to weaken the design. The design nevertheless included several innovations, including the large-scale use of welding rather than rivets to save weight.

During World War II, she was used to lay mines in the North Sea, to provide gunfire support to ground troops, and as a convoy escort and training ship for cadets. She participated in Operation Weserübung, the invasion of Norway in April 1940. Her wartime career ended in Kiel in April 1945, when British bombers badly damaged the ship while she was in dock for repairs. Her crew ran her aground to prevent her from sinking, and ultimately blew her up with demolition charges to prevent the Allies from capturing her in May. The wreck was eventually scrapped in the late 1940s.

Summary of the Emden class
Ship	Armament	Armor	Displacement	Propulsion	Service		
Ship	Armament	Armor	Displacement	Propulsion	Laid down	Commissioned	Fate
Emden	8 × 15 cm SK L/45 guns	40 mm	6,990 long tons (7,102 t)	2 shafts, 2 steam turbines, 29.5 kn (54.6 km/h; 33.9 mph)	8 December 1921	15 October 1925	Destroyed, 3 May 1945

=== Königsberg class (1927) ===
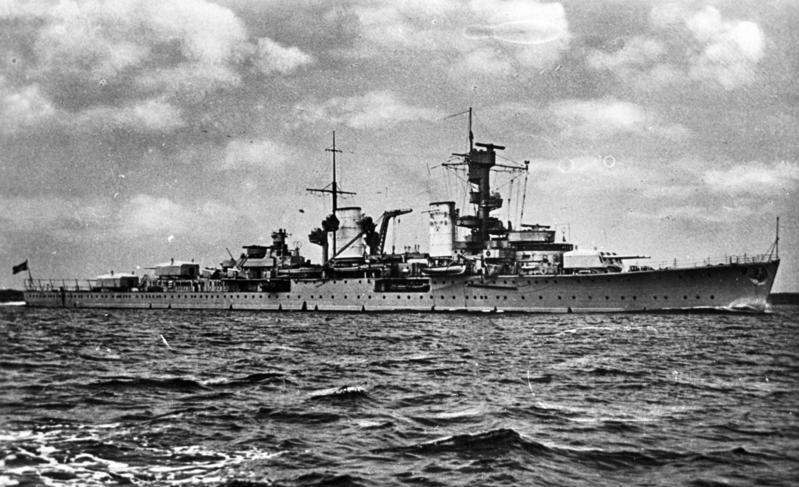
A member of the class in 1936

The third class of cruisers named after the capital of East Prussia marked a radical divergence from earlier cruiser designs. (Note: This class is sometimes referred to as the K class, because all three vessels' names start with that letter.) A new triple gun turret was adopted for the main battery, with one forward and two aft in a superfiring pair, offset from the centerline. And new, longer C/25 model guns were used. Major use of welding was also a feature of this class of cruisers, and diesel engines were used in combination with the turbines to increase their cruising radius, though only one set of engines could be run at one time.

The three ships all participated in the non-intervention patrols during the Spanish Civil War in 1936–1939. After the outbreak of war, they were used to lay defensive minefields along with Emden, and in April 1940, participated in the invasion of Norway. Two of the three cruisers, Karlsruhe and Königsberg, were sunk during the invasion; Karlsruhe was torpedoed by a British submarine off Kristiansand and Königsberg was sunk by British divebombers in Bergen. Köln was used in a variety of roles after the conclusion of the campaign, including as a testbed for operating the Flettner Fl 282 helicopter at sea. She was bombed and sunk by American heavy bombers in Wilhelmshaven in March 1945, though she sank in shallow water on an even keel, which allowed her guns to provide gunfire support to German troops until the end of the war.

Summary of the Königsberg class
Ship	Armament	Armor	Displacement	Propulsion	Service		
Ship	Armament	Armor	Displacement	Propulsion	Laid down	Commissioned	Fate
Königsberg	9 × 15 cm SK C/25 guns	40 mm	7,700 long tons (7,824 t)	3 shafts, 4 steam turbines, 2 diesel engines, 32 kn	12 April 1926	17 April 1929	Sunk, 10 April 1940
Karlsruhe	9 × 15 cm SK C/25 guns	40 mm	7,700 long tons (7,824 t)	3 shafts, 4 steam turbines, 2 diesel engines, 32 kn	27 July 1926	6 November 1929	Sunk, 9 April 1940
Köln	9 × 15 cm SK C/25 guns	40 mm	7,700 long tons (7,824 t)	3 shafts, 4 steam turbines, 2 diesel engines, 32 kn	7 August 1926	15 January 1930	Sunk, 3 March 1945

=== Leipzig class ===
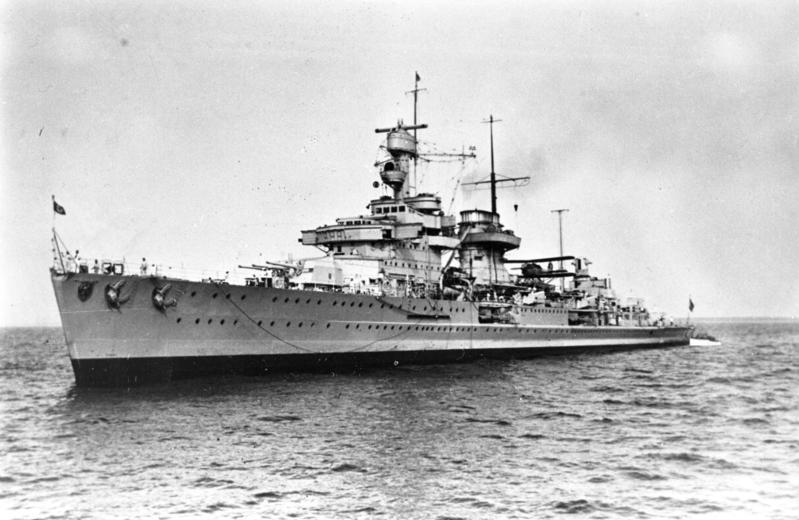
Nürnberg at sea in 1935

Leipzig and Nürnberg were the follow-on class to the three Königsberg-class ships. (Note: These vessels are sometimes treated as unique ships, rather than as members of a class due to their slightly dissimilar designs.) They were built to a modified design, which included returning the aft turrets to the centerline. Another major change was a new gear system that allowed the diesel and turbine engines to run at the same time, which permitted a lighter propulsion system to reach the same speed of the earlier ships. They were also fitted with bulbous bows to improve their hydrodynamic efficiency. The two cruisers were not identical: Leipzig had a superstructure similar to the Königsbergs, while Nürnberg was built with a much larger structure. Nürnberg was also completed with a much stronger anti-aircraft battery.

Both Leipzig and Nürnberg were deployed to the non-intervention patrols in Spanish waters in the late 1930s. The British submarine HMS Salmon managed to torpedo both cruisers on 13 December 1939, though both ships made it back to port for repairs. The two cruisers were withdrawn from front-line service thereafter and used as training ships. In October 1944, Leipzig was rammed and badly damaged by the heavy cruiser Prinz Eugen; repairs were deemed to be uneconomical, and the crippled ship was used to provide gunfire support to retreating German forces around Gotenhafen (Gdynia) in March 1945. She was used as a barracks ship after the war and scuttled in July 1946. Nürnberg, meanwhile, was seized by the Soviet Union as a war prize and commissioned into the Soviet Navy as Admiral Makarov; she served in the Baltic Fleet until the late 1950s, and was broken up for scrap sometime around 1960.

Summary of the Leipzig class
Ship	Armament	Armor	Displacement	Propulsion	Service		
Ship	Armament	Armor	Displacement	Propulsion	Laid down	Commissioned	Fate
Leipzig	9 × 15 cm SK C/25 guns	30 mm (1.2 in)	8,100 t (7,972 long tons)	3 shafts, 2 steam turbines, 4 diesel engines, 32 kn	28 April 1928	8 October 1931	Scuttled, July 1946
Nürnberg	9 × 15 cm SK C/25 guns	30 mm (1.2 in)	9,040 t (8,897 long tons)	3 shafts, 2 steam turbines, 4 diesel engines, 32 kn	1934	2 November 1935	Scrapped, c. 1960

=== M class ===
Illustration of the M-class design

The M class was authorized by Plan Z in 1939, though design work started as early as 1936; these ships were intended to serve as the reconnaissance units for the commerce raiding squadrons envisioned in the plan. The Navy placed very high requirements for long range, heavy armament, armor proof against guns of the ships' caliber, and high speeds, which forced the designers to compromise crucial aspects of the design, including the armor and armament, both of which were too weak. This led the design staff to rework the plans for the last two ships to rectify some of these flaws. Work began on the first two ships in 1938, but the outbreak of war in September 1939 forced the Navy to abandon work on warships that could not be completed quickly. As a result, those two ships were scrapped and the remaining four were never laid down.

Summary of the M class
Ship	Armament	Armor	Displacement	Propulsion	Service		
Ship	Armament	Armor	Displacement	Propulsion	Laid down	Commissioned	Fate
M	8 × 15 cm SK C/28 guns	25 mm	8,500 t (8,366 long tons)	3 shafts, 2 steam turbines, 4 diesel engines, 35.5 kn (65.7 km/h; 40.9 mph)	1938	—	Scrapped, 1939
N	8 × 15 cm SK C/28 guns	25 mm	8,500 t (8,366 long tons)	3 shafts, 2 steam turbines, 4 diesel engines, 35.5 kn (65.7 km/h; 40.9 mph)	1938	—	Scrapped, 1939
O	8 × 15 cm SK C/28 guns	25 mm	8,500 t (8,366 long tons)	3 shafts, 2 steam turbines, 4 diesel engines, 35.5 kn (65.7 km/h; 40.9 mph)	—	—	—
P	8 × 15 cm SK C/28 guns	25 mm	8,500 t (8,366 long tons)	3 shafts, 2 steam turbines, 4 diesel engines, 35.5 kn (65.7 km/h; 40.9 mph)	—	—	—
Q	8 × 15 cm SK C/28 guns	25 mm	9,300 t (9,153 long tons)	3 shafts, 2 steam turbines, 4 diesel engines, 35.5 kn (65.7 km/h; 40.9 mph)	—	—	—
R	8 × 15 cm SK C/28 guns	25 mm	9,300 t (9,153 long tons)	3 shafts, 2 steam turbines, 4 diesel engines, 35.5 kn (65.7 km/h; 40.9 mph)	—	—	—
