= Russian ship Svetlana =

At least three ships of the Imperial Russian Navy have been named Svetlana.

- Russian frigate Svetlana (1858), a 40-gun steam frigate built in France and sold for scrap in 1892 - see List of Russian steam frigates.
- Russian cruiser Svetlana (1896), a French-built protected cruiser sunk during the Battle of Tsushima in 1905.
- Russian cruiser Svetlana (1915), name ship of the Svetlana-class light cruisers; renamed Krasny Krym by the Soviets before she was completed. Sold for scrap in 1959.
