= SM U-116 =

History

German Empire
- Name: U-116
- Builder: Schichau-Werke, Elbing
- Cost: 4,100,000 Goldmark
- Yard number: 987
- Laid down: September 1916
- Launched: 1918
- Fate: never completed, broken up at Danzig

General characteristics
- Class & type: German Type U 115 submarine
- Displacement: 882 t (868 long tons) surfaced; 1,233 t (1,214 long tons) submerged
- Length: 72.30 m (237 ft 2 in)
- Beam: 6.50 m (21 ft 4 in)
- Draught: 4 m (13 ft 1 in)
- Propulsion: 2 shafts; 2 × MAN four-stroke diesel motors with 2,400 PS (1,770 kW; 2,370 shp); 2 × SSW double dynamos with 1,200 PS (880 kW; 1,180 shp); 450 rpm surfaced; 330 rpm submerged
- Speed: 16 knots (30 km/h; 18 mph) surfaced; 9 knots (17 km/h; 10 mph) submerged
- Range: 11,470 nautical miles (21,240 km; 13,200 mi) at 8 kn surfaced; 60 nautical miles (110 km; 69 mi) at 4.5 kn submerged
- Test depth: 50 m (160 ft)
- Complement: 4 officers, 32 men
- Armament: 6 × 45 cm (18 in) torpedo tubes (4 bow, 2 stern); 1 × 10.5 cm (4.1 in) L/45 and; 1 × 8.8 cm (3.5 in) L/30 deck gun

SM U-116 (Note: "SM" stands for "Seiner Majestät" (English: His Majesty's) and combined with the U for Unterseeboot would be translated as His Majesty's Submarine.) was a German Type 115 U-boat of the Imperial German Navy built at Schichau-Werke, Danzig. As her sister ship SM U-115, she was never completed and ultimately broken up in Danzig after the Armistice with Germany. Her main engines were used in M/S Adolf Sommerfeld ex SMS Gefion. Both boats had been offered to the IGN free of charge by Schichau in an attempt to gain experience in building submarines (Williamson, 15).
