= SMS Gefion =

Unprotected cruiser of the German Imperial Navy

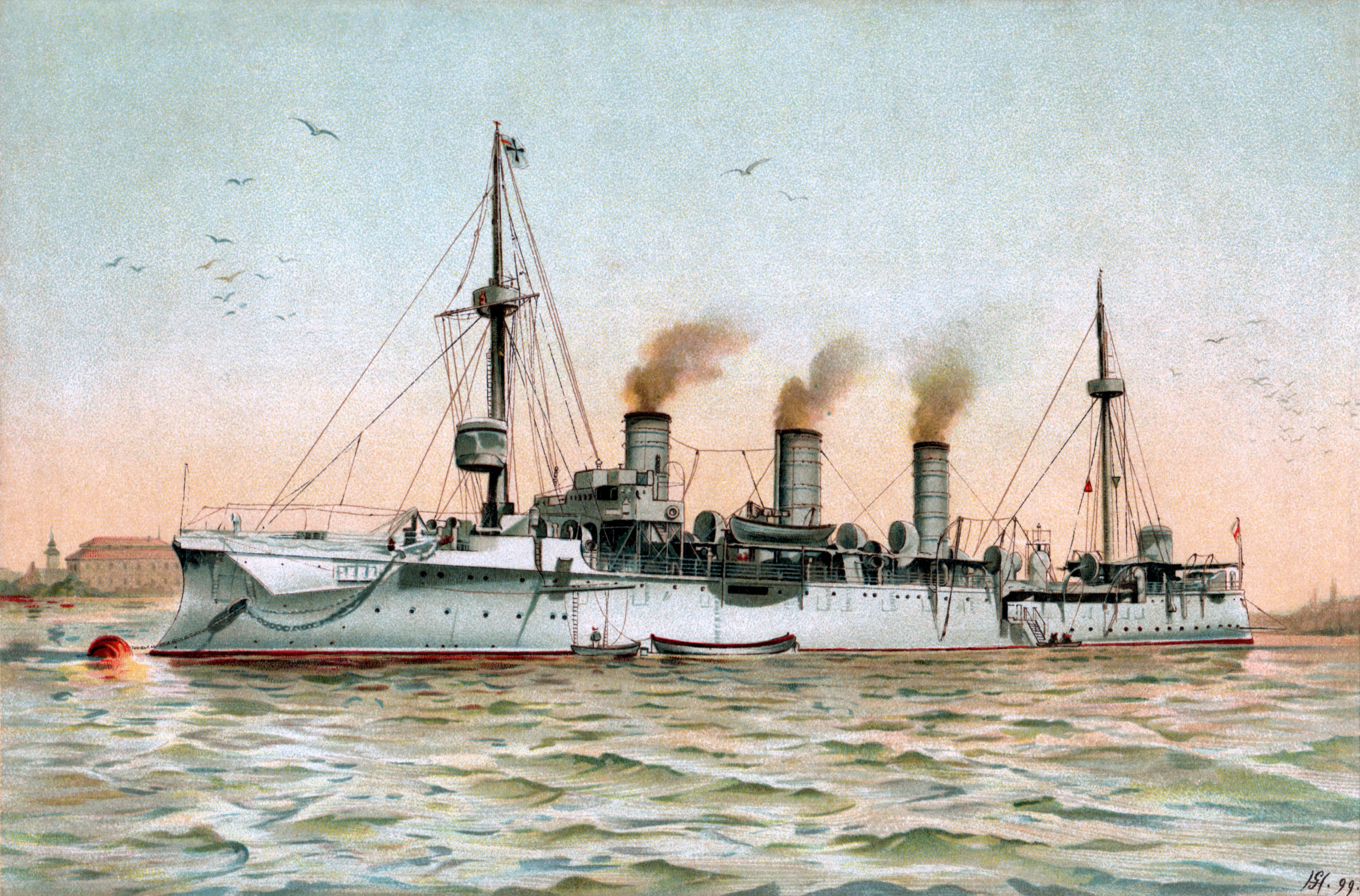
- 1902 lithograph of Gefion

Class overview
- Preceded by: Bussard class
- Succeeded by: None

History

German Empire
- Name: SMS Gefion
- Namesake: SMS Gefion
- Builder: Schichau-Werke, Danzig
- Laid down: 28 March 1892
- Launched: 31 March 1893
- Commissioned: 5 June 1895
- Decommissioned: 1 October 1901
- Renamed: Adolf Sommerfeld, 1920
- Stricken: 5 November 1919
- Fate: Broken up in 1923

General characteristics
- Type: Unprotected cruiser
- Displacement: 4,275 t (4,207 long tons; 4,712 short tons)
- Length: 110.4 m (362 ft)
- Beam: 13.2 m (43 ft)
- Draft: 6.47 m (21.2 ft)
- Installed power: 6 × coal-fired water-tube boilers; 9,000 ihp (6,700 kW)
- Propulsion: 2 triple-expansion engines
- Speed: 19.5 knots (36.1 km/h; 22.4 mph)
- Range: 3,500 nmi (6,500 km; 4,000 mi) at 12 kn (22 km/h; 14 mph)
- Complement: 13 officers; 289 enlisted men
- Armament: 10 × 10.5 cm (4.1 in) SK L/35 guns; 6 × 5 cm SK L/40 guns; 2 × 45 cm torpedo tubes
- Armor: Deck: 25 mm (0.98 in)

SMS Gefion ("His Majesty's Ship Gefion") (Note: "SMS" stands for "Seiner Majestät Schiff" (German: His Majesty's Ship).) was an unprotected cruiser of the German Kaiserliche Marine (Imperial Navy), the last ship of the type built in Germany. She was laid down in March 1892, launched in March 1893, and completed in June 1895 after lengthy trials and repairs. The cruiser was named after the earlier sail frigate Gefion, which had been named for the goddess Gefjon of Norse mythology. Intended for service in the German colonial empire and as a fleet scout, Gefion was armed with a main battery of ten 10.5-centimeter (4.1 in) guns, had a top speed in excess of 19.5 knots (36.1 km/h; 22.4 mph), and could steam for 3,500 nautical miles (6,500 km; 4,000 mi), the longest range of any German warship at the time. Nevertheless, the conflicting requirements necessary for a fleet scout and an overseas cruiser produced an unsuccessful design, and Gefion was rapidly replaced in both roles by the newer Gazelle class of light cruisers.

Gefion initially served with the main German fleet and frequently escorted Kaiser Wilhelm II's yacht Hohenzollern on trips to other European countries, including a state visit to Russia in 1897. In late 1897, Gefion was reassigned to the East Asia Squadron; she arrived there in May 1898. The ship took part in the Battle of Taku Forts in June 1900 during the Boxer Uprising in China. She returned to Germany in 1901 and was modernized, but she did not return to service after the work was finished in 1904. She was to be mobilized after the outbreak of World War I in August 1914, but a crew could not be assembled due to shortages of personnel. Instead, she was used as a barracks ship in Danzig from 1916 to the end of the war. In 1920, she was sold, converted into a freighter, and renamed Adolf Sommerfeld. She served in this capacity for only three years, and was broken up for scrap in Danzig in 1923.

== Background ==
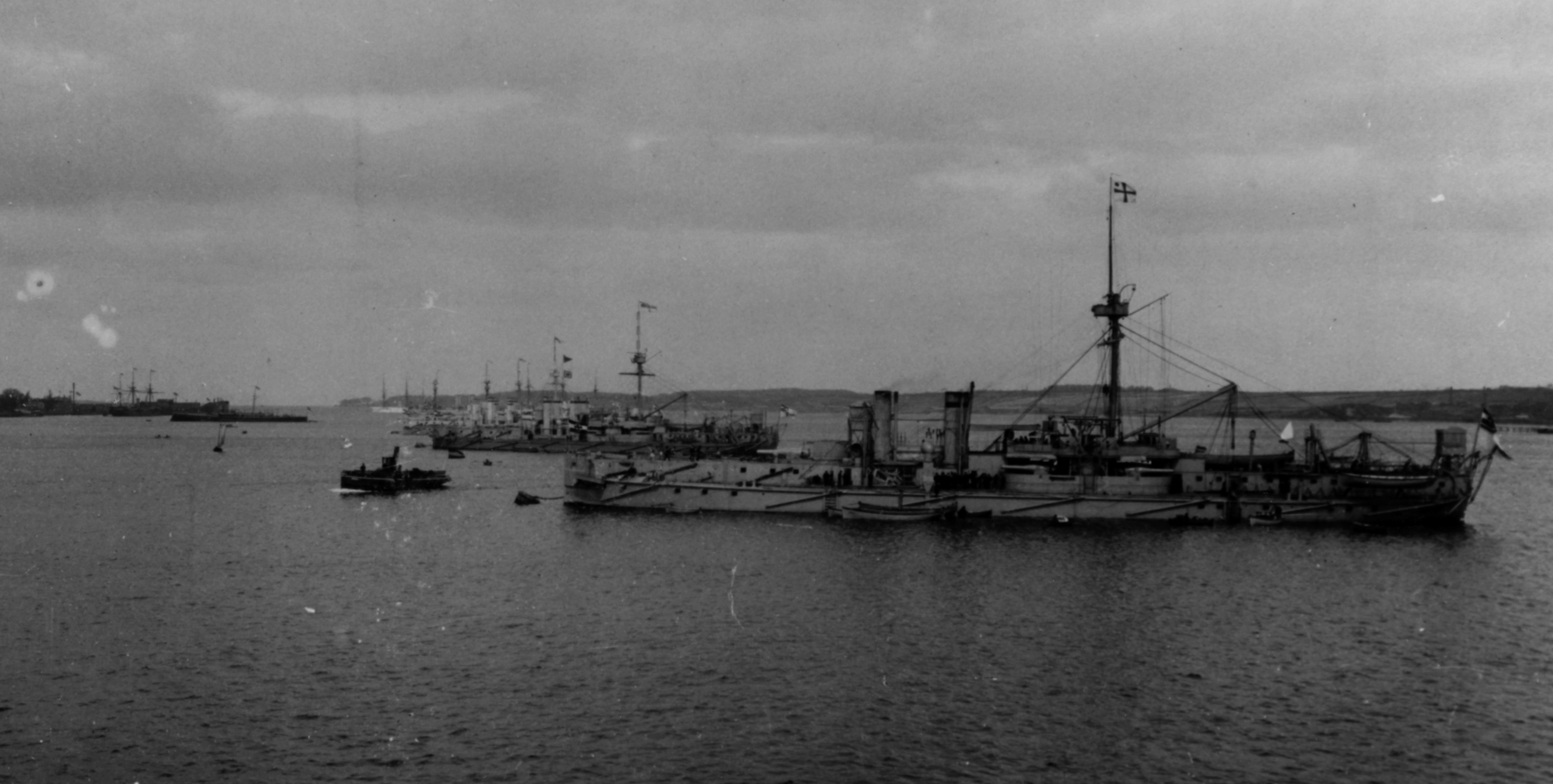
The German fleet in the 1890s; visible are Sachsen-class ironclads, a Wacht-class aviso, and a Bismarck-class corvette

In the mid-1880s, the German Kaiserliche Marine (Imperial Navy) had begun a program of construction to modernize its cruiser force, beginning with the Irene class of protected cruisers of 1886, followed the Schwalbe-class unprotected cruisers in 1886–1887 and Kaiserin Augusta in 1888. By the end of 1888, Admirals Alexander von Monts and Friedrich von Hollmann had become the chiefs of the Kaiserliche Admiralität (Imperial Admiralty) and Reichsmarineamt (Imperial Naval Office), respectively. At the time, naval construction in Germany was marred by a sense of strategic confusion; the navy was at the same time building the four Brandenburg-class battleships—necessary for an offensive strategy—and the coastal defense ships of the Siegfried and Odin classes—which belied an inherently defensive orientation for the fleet. At the same time, many elements of the naval command espoused the commerce raiding strategy of the French Jeune École (Young School).

Hollmann submitted a memorandum to the Reichstag (Imperial Diet) to request funding for a new construction program. He called for a total of seven new cruisers over the following three years to replace the old screw corvettes that still made up the bulk of the cruiser force. He argued that the old screw corvettes were no longer suitable as warships, owing to the proliferation of modern unprotected and protected cruisers in even minor navies around the world, along with the advances in marine steam engines, which propelled merchant vessels to speeds at which the corvettes could not catch them. The Reichstag's budget board decried what it viewed as the limitless demands of the navy. Instead of the three ships Hollmann had requested for the 1890/1891 fiscal year, the Reichstag authorized just two, which were given the provisional designations "J" and "K". (Note: German warships were ordered under provisional names. Additions to the fleet were given a single letter; ships intended to replace older or lost vessels were ordered as "Ersatz (name of the ship to be replaced)".)

At the time, cruisers were divided between two broad types: vessels suitable for long-distances cruising and those optimized for fleet service. Germany lacked the financial resources to build dedicated vessels for each role, and like many navies of the time, the German fleet was forced to build ships that could fill both roles. Any new cruisers would have to be capable of patrolling the German colonial empire and serve as a scout for the main battle fleet. The former task included policing German holdings and suppressing native unrest during peacetime, and in times of war the new ship would act as a commerce raider. These tasks necessitated a long cruising radius and relatively heavy armament. Cruisers optimized for fleet service instead needed high top speeds to effectively scout, and heavy armor to survive fleet battles. The German naval command and its design staff had not only to reconcile the confused strategic thinking of the time with the need to combine both types of cruisers into a single vessel, they also had to cope with the rapidly advancing state of naval technology.

== Design ==
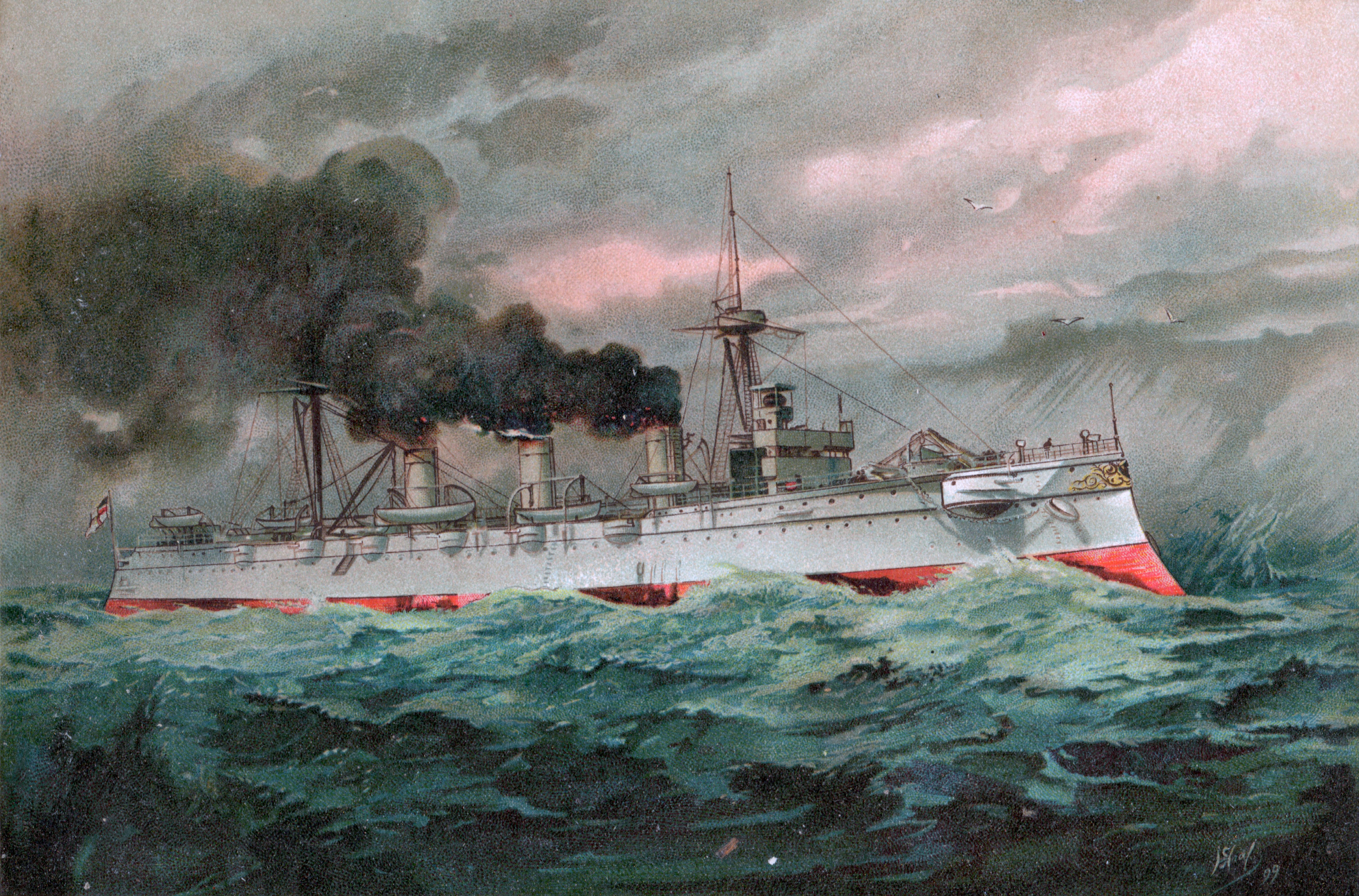
Lithograph of SMS Kaiserin Augusta, which heavily influenced the design process for Gefion

With funding to begin work on the new ship secured, senior naval officers began the process of sketching out requirements for the new design in 1889. Admiral Max von der Goltz, the chief of the Kaiserliches Oberkommando der Marine (Imperial Naval High Command) wanted to repeat Kaiserin Augusta with some improvements, including an armament of 15 cm (5.9 in) SK L/35 guns. (KzS—Captain at Sea) August von Thomsen of the General Department expressed concerns that these guns were too heavy. A cruising radius of 9,000 nautical miles (17,000 km; 10,000 mi) was desired, but the Department of Construction informed the command that the ship would have to be enlarged to provide enough coal storage space. But due to the Reichstag's opposition to further budgetary increases, a larger (and more expensive) ship was out of the question.

Arguments over the caliber of the main battery continued into 1890; Goltz pointed to contemporary French cruisers to justify heavier armament, since these would be the most likely enemies in a future war. The 15 cm gun was necessary to penetrate the heavy armor carried by the armored cruisers Dupuy de Lôme and Amiral Charner. Chief Constructor Alfred Dietrich pointed out that the desired battery of 15 cm guns would require a displacement greatly in excess of 6,000 t (5,900 long tons; 6,600 short tons) to mount such a battery, a significant increase in size and cost over Kaiserin Augusta. Other officers, including a group led by Thomsen, preferred a battery of up to twenty 10.5 cm (4.1 in) SK L/35 guns. The Military-Technical Commission finally decided in December that the weight issue mandated the 10.5 cm gun, and its chief, Vizeadmiral (VAdm—Vice Admiral) Hans von Koester, submitted a proposal for a ship armed with ten of the guns. In addition, due to the difficult budget situation, the size of the ship would be reduced from around 6,000 tons to around 3,700 t (3,600 long tons; 4,100 short tons) as designed.

Gefion, classified as a cruiser-corvette, was authorized in the 1890–1891 budget and named for the earlier sail frigate Gefion. The contract for her construction was awarded to Schichau-Werke in late 1891. She was the last unprotected cruiser built by the Kaiserliche Marine; thereafter, the Germans built the Gazelle class of light cruisers to fill the need for small, overseas cruisers. As a result of the competing design requirements, the resulting design for Gefion was unsatisfactory.

=== General characteristics and machinery ===
Plan and profile drawing of Gefion

Gefion was 109.2 meters (358 ft) long at the waterline and 110.4 m (362 ft) long overall. She had a beam of 13.2 m (43 ft) and had a draft of 6.47 m (21.2 ft) forward and 6.27 m (20.6 ft) aft. She was designed to displace 3,746 metric tons (3,687 long tons; 4,129 short tons), but with a full ammunition, stores, and fuel load she displaced up to 4,275 t (4,207 long tons; 4,712 short tons). The hull was constructed from transverse and longitudinal steel frames, except for the lower stem and stern parts, which were made of bronze. The frames were covered with wood planking and a metal sheath that extended to 1 m (3 ft 3 in) above the waterline to reduce fouling.

She was fitted with a fore and main pole mast with spotting tops to aid her gunnery. The ship had a crew of 13 officers and 289 enlisted men. She carried a number of small boats, including one picket boat, one pinnace, two cutters, two yawls, and one dinghy. Gefion was crank, rolled badly, and made severe leeway, and her decks were wet in a head sea. She nevertheless maneuvered well and had a tight turning radius. She had a metacentric height of .55 m (1 ft 10 in). Steering was controlled by a single rudder.

Gefion was powered by two vertical, 3-cylinder triple expansion engines, which drove a pair of 3-bladed screw propellers that were 4.2 m (14 ft) in diameter. Steam was provided by six coal-fired, transverse, cylindrical, double water-tube boilers, which were trunked into three vertical funnels. The engines were designed to produce 9,000 indicated horsepower (6,700 kW) for a top speed of 19 knots (35 km/h; 22 mph). On trials, her engines produced 9,827 ihp (7,328 kW) and a speed of 20.5 kn (38.0 km/h; 23.6 mph). The ship could store up to 860 t (850 long tons; 950 short tons) of coal, which enabled her to steam for 3,500 nautical miles (6,500 km; 4,000 mi) at a cruising speed of 12 kn (22 km/h; 14 mph). Electrical power was provided by three generators, which supplied a total output of 40 kilowatts (54 hp) at 67 volts.

=== Armament and armor ===
Gefion was armed with a main battery of ten 10.5 cm SK L/35 guns, which were carried individually in pivot mounts. Two were placed side by side forward, another pair side by side aft, and two more pairs were placed between the funnels and the main mast, all on the upper deck with gun shields. The remaining two guns were placed lower in embrasures abreast the first funnel. These guns were supplied with a total of 807 rounds of ammunition, and they had a maximum range of 10,800 m (35,400 ft). She was also equipped with six 5 cm (2.0 in) SK L/40 guns, with 1,500 rounds. These were also mounted individually; two were placed in the bow in embrasures abreast the second funnel. They had a range of 6,200 m (20,300 ft). The ship was also fitted with two 45 cm (18 in) deck-mounted torpedo tubes with a total of five torpedoes.

The ship was protected with a light armored deck consisting of steel, though it only covered the propulsion machinery spaces. The deck was 25 mm (0.98 in) thick, with 30 mm (1.2 in) thick sloped sides. Above the engines themselves, a glacis that was 100 mm (3.9 in) thick, backed with 180 mm (7.1 in) of teak, covered the engine cylinders. A small section of 25 mm armor plate covered the steering gear at the stern. At the bases of the funnels, coamings that were 40 mm (1.6 in) thick protected the uptakes from the boilers.

== Service history ==
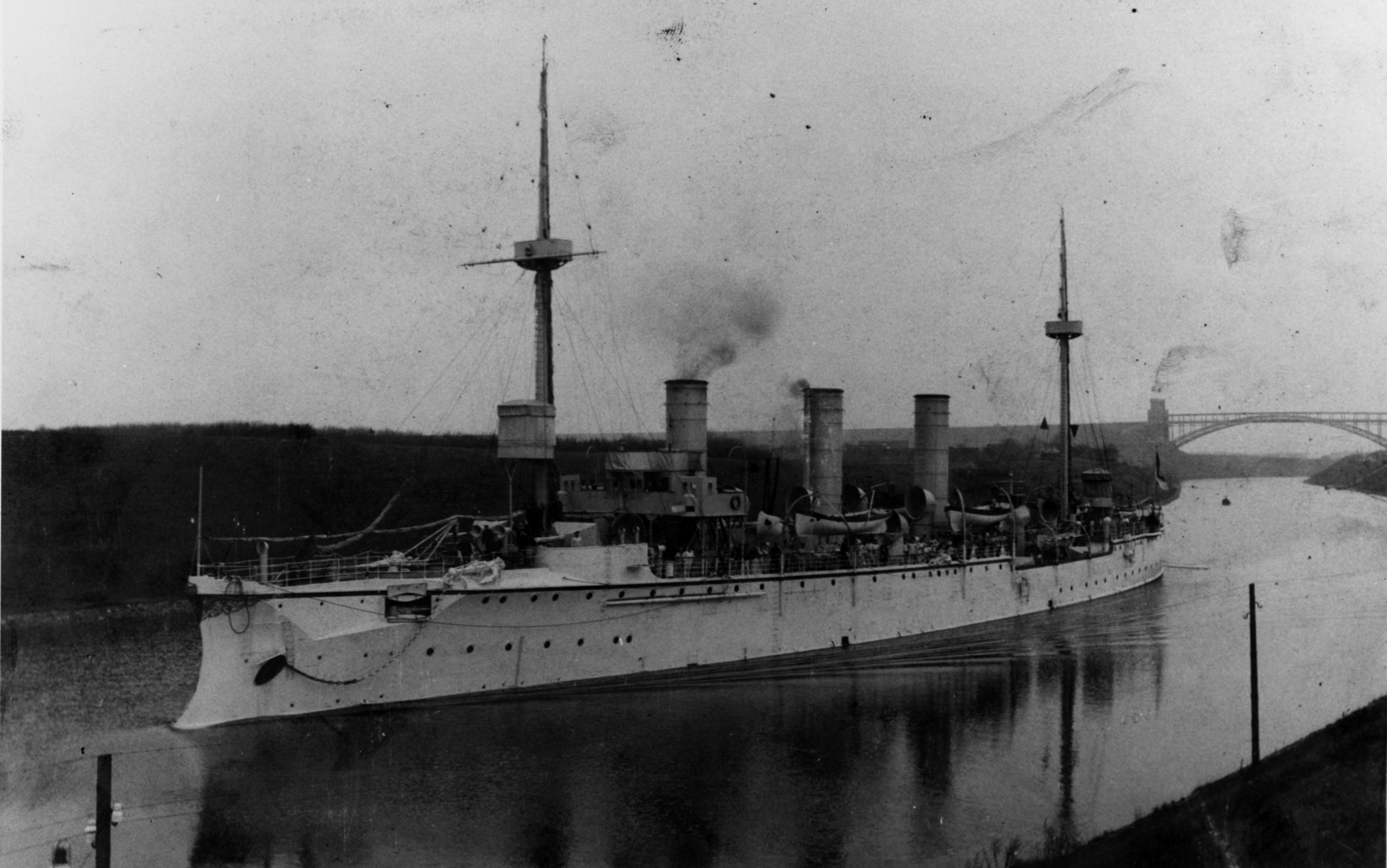
Gefion in the Kiel Canal sometime in the mid-1890s; the Levensau High Bridge is visible in the background

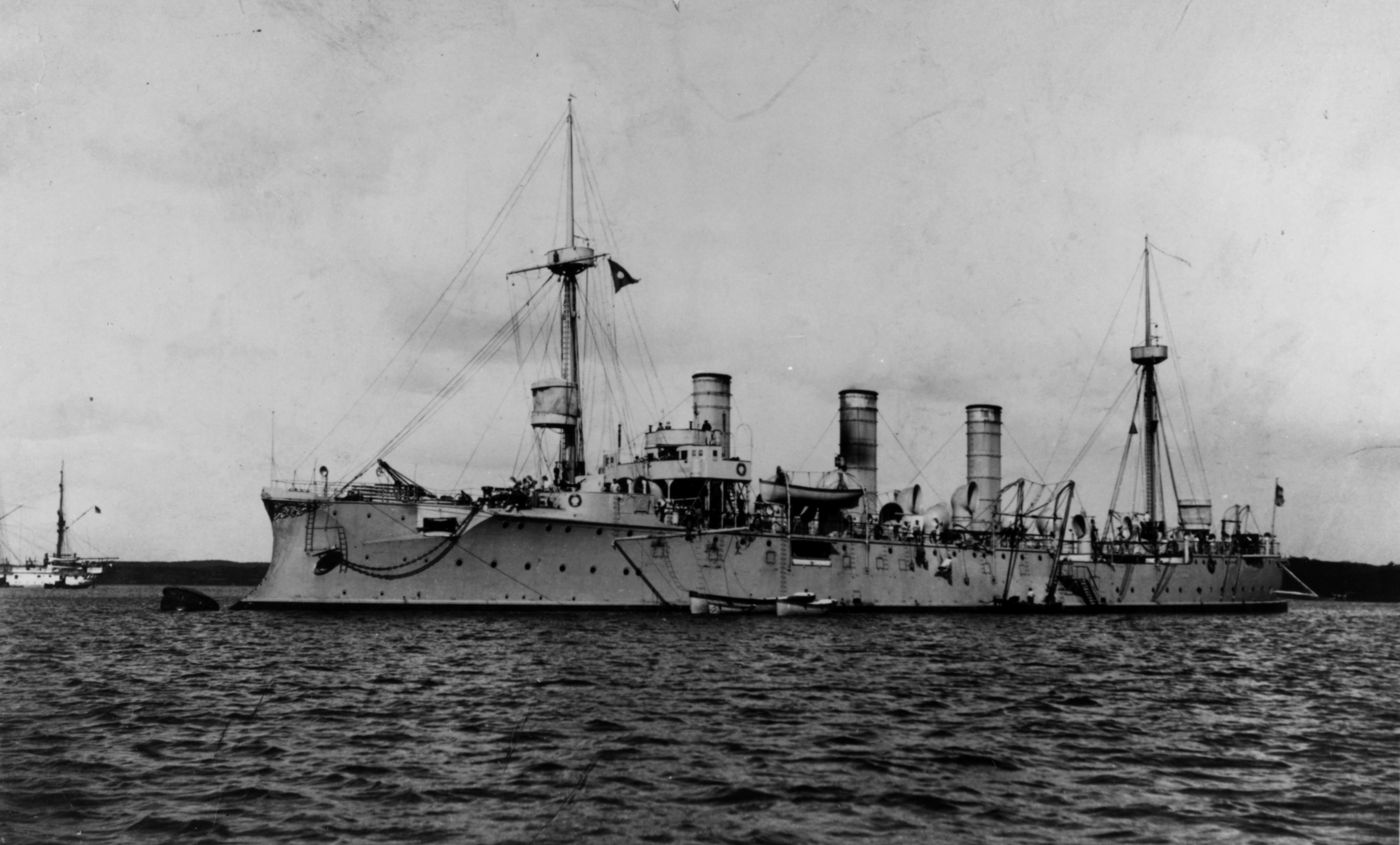
Gefion, c. 1894, soon after her commissioning

The keel for the new cruiser was laid down on 28 March 1892 at the Schichau-Werke shipyard in Danzig, and the completed hull was launched on 31 March 1893. Kaiser Wilhelm II attended her launching, and the speech was given by the director of the Kaiserliche Werft (Imperial Shipyard) in Danzig, KzS Graf Kurt von Haugwitz. Sea trials began on 27 June 1894 at Kiel and lasted until 2 October. Serious defects in her design, in particular poor ventilation, were revealed through the trials, which necessitated modifications at the Kaiserliche Werft in Kiel. She was accordingly placed in reserve after completing her trials. The work lasted until mid-1895, and the ship was ready for commissioning on 5 June 1895. That month, she was present for the celebration marking the opening of the Kaiser Wilhelm Canal.

In July, she escorted Wilhelm II's yacht Hohenzollern on a visit to the king of Sweden and a trip to the Cowes Regatta. The two ships thereafter visited Leith in the Firth of Forth. Following her return to Wilhelmshaven on 17 August, she participated in the annual autumn fleet maneuvers. During the maneuvers, Gefion, a pair of torpedo boats, and a salvage ship searched for the wrecked torpedo boat S 41 in Jammer Bay on 28 August. A second attempt was made on 24 September, but it too was unsuccessful. She thereafter resumed her duties as escort for Hohenzollern, and during this period she conducted further sea trials that confirmed her cruising radius, which was the highest of all German ships at the time.

In February 1896, she was assigned as the watch ship in Kiel. From 24 to 30 May, she joined maneuvers in the Baltic Sea with the II Division of the I Squadron; these were the four Sachsen-class ironclads. Gefion rejoined Hohenzollern as her escort for Wilhelm II's voyage to Norway in July. While there, on 10 July, Gefion helped pull free the stranded French steamer SS Chanzy. From 9 August to 15 September, Gefion participated in the annual autumn fleet maneuvers in the Baltic and North Seas. By 17 September, she was back in Kiel to resume her duties as watch ship. From 2 to 14 December, she accompanied the II Division through the Kattegat and Skagerrak. She returned to Kiel in early 1897 and continued her watch ship duties until June. She took Admiral Koester on a trip to Sassnitz in April for celebrations to mark the opening of the first telegraph cable between Germany and Sweden. In June she began to serve as a training ship for stokers. During this period, she escorted Hohenzollern to a sailing regatta in the mouth of the Elbe, which was followed by another trip to Norway and Sweden in July.

On 30 July, Gefion was back in Kiel, though she escorted Hohenzollern to Kronstadt from 4 to 13 August for Wilhelm II to have a meeting with Czar Nicholas II of Russia, along with the I and II Divisions of the Heimatflotte (Home Fleet). Gefion thereafter joined the autumn maneuvers, which lasted until 22 September. She then returned to Kiel for periodic repairs. After this work was completed in December, Gefion was assigned to the newly formed II Division of the East Asia Squadron. The Division was commanded by Prince Heinrich, the brother of Wilhelm II, who flew his flag in the re-built armored cruiser Deutschland. The protected cruiser Kaiserin Augusta was the third ship in the division. On 15 December, the three ships left Germany, Wilhelm II having instructed their crews, "Should anyone seek to hinder you in the proper exercise of our legitimate rights, go for them with a mailed fist." The division was bound for the newly conquered base at Tsingtau in the Jiaozhou Bay Leased Territory. They arrived on 5 May 1898 and met the rest of the squadron, which was commanded by VAdm Otto von Diederichs.

=== Deployment to the China Station ===
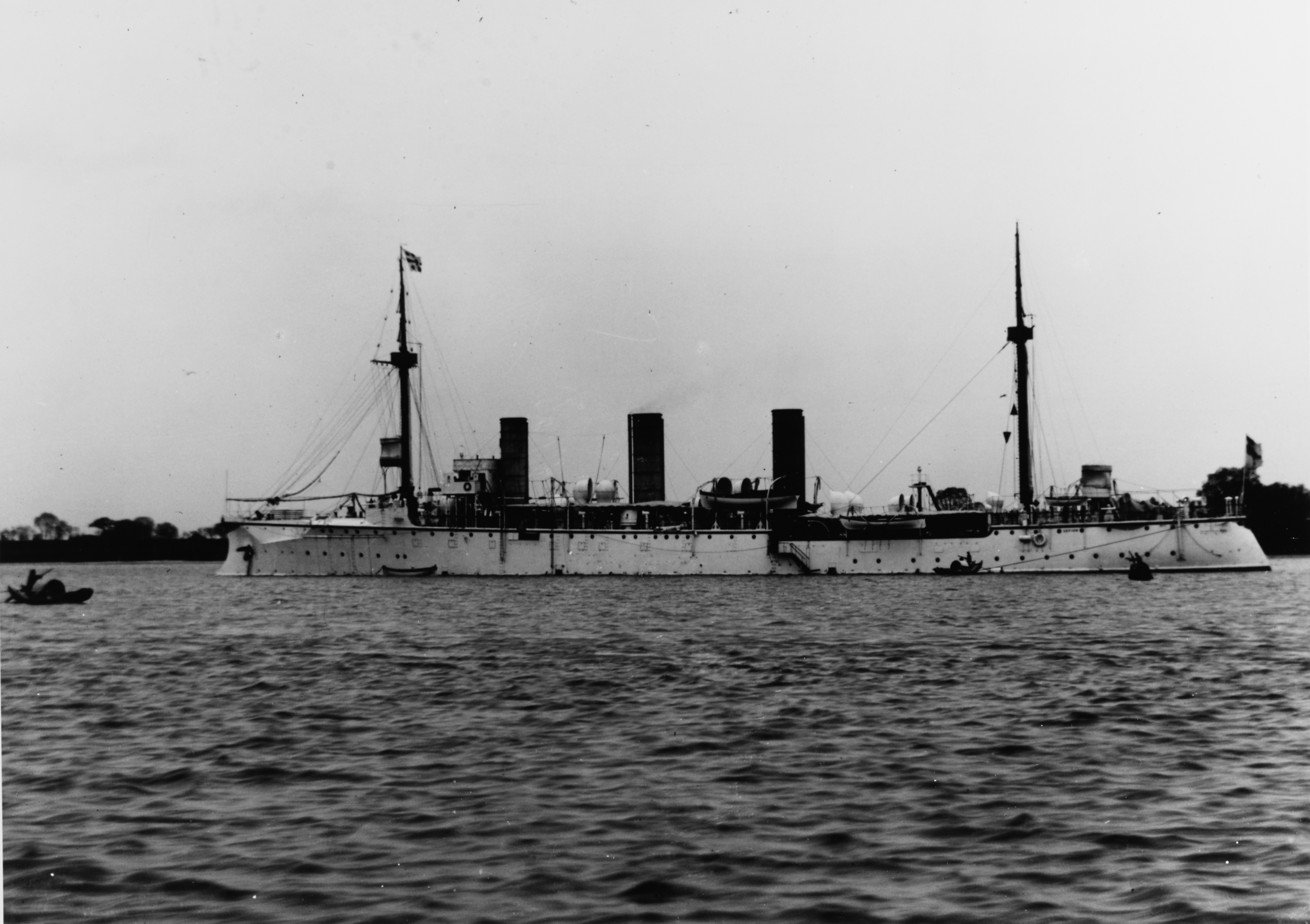
Gefion, probably during her deployment to the East Asia Squadron

Shortly before the arrival of the II Division, the United States Navy destroyed the Spanish fleet at the Battle of Manila Bay during the Spanish–American War. Diederichs detached Gefion to investigate the situation in Manila in an attempt to maneuver Germany into a position to secure colonial possessions in the Philippines, or even to obtain a German prince on the Philippine throne outright. In late March 1899, Gefion was sent to Kiaotschou in response to mistreatment of German missionaries there; Kapitänleutnant (Captain Lieutenant) Franz Grapow went ashore with a landing party of 132 marines and artillerymen to punish the offenders.

In April, Prince Heinrich replaced Diederichs as the squadron commander. That same month, Gefion had to leave the harbor at Wusong to assist Deutschland, which had suffered engine damage. At the end of the month, Gefion steamed up the Yangtze River as far as Hankou. She visited Japanese ports, including Nagasaki, starting in June and the Russian port of Vladivostok in August, before having to assist Deutschland once again, after the latter vessel struck a reef in Samsah Bay in Fujian. As a precautionary measure, she escorted Deutschland to Hong Kong for repairs. At the end of the year, Gefion met Deutschland in Bangkok; the latter vessel was carrying Prince Heinrich back to Germany. In January 1900, Vizeadmiral Felix von Bendemann arrived to take command of the East Asia Squadron, aboard his flagship, the protected cruiser Hertha. In the first half of the year, Gefion and the rest of the squadron cruised in the German central Pacific colonies.

By the end of May 1900, the unrest that sparked the Boxer Uprising began to appear in the Shandong Peninsula, particularly around the German base at Tsingtau. After the outbreak of the rebellion, Gefion and the rest of the squadron joined ships from other European navies to launch a relief expedition under the command of Edward Hobart Seymour. The ships bombarded Chinese coastal defenses southeast of Tianjin and sent an expeditionary force—the Seymour Expedition—ashore at the Battle of Taku Forts on 16–17 June. The contingent from Gefion was commanded by Kapitänleutnant Otto Weniger; these men participated in the storming of the Great Hsi-Ku Arsenal in Tianjin. Starting in mid-July, Gefion was stationed outside the mouth of the Yangtze to monitor traffic in the area. In November, she went to Hong Kong for an overhaul. In January 1901, the ship's commander was sent to temporarily govern Tsingtau on behalf of the ill governor. Between February and April, Gefion was in Nagasaki, and in June she was stationed at Shanghai. She stayed there until September, when the Admiralstab (Admiralty Staff) ordered her to return to Germany. On 22 September she departed Chinese waters and arrived back in Germany on 1 October.

=== Later service ===
Illustration of Gefion during her deployment to the East Asia Squadron

She was decommissioned for a major reconstruction the day she returned to Germany. The work was done at the Kaiserliche Werft in Wilhelmshaven from December 1901 to 1904. New, more powerful electrical generators were installed, the upper deck was enclosed, and the 10.5 cm guns that had been located on the upper deck were moved to gun ports in the hull. The two 5 cm guns that were located abreast of the center funnel were moved further aft, to the third funnel. After completion of the work, Gefion was left out of service in reserve. Following the outbreak of World War I in August 1914, the Admiralstab ordered Gefion to be reactivated, and on 10 August Korvettenkapitän (Corvette Captain) Waldeyer was placed in command of the ship. A crew could not be assembled due to shortages in personnel, however, and so the ship could not be placed back into service. Waldeyer was therefore transferred to another ship on 21 August. Gefion was thereafter moved to Danzig in 1916 for use as a barracks ship for crews of warships being repaired at the Kaiserliche Werft there. She remained there for the duration of the war, and was stricken from the Navy Directory on 5 November 1919.

She was thereafter sold to Norddeutsche Tiefbaugesellschaft, converted into a diesel-powered freighter, and renamed Adolf Sommerfeld in 1920. She had been purchased along with the old pre-dreadnought Brandenburg, from which some material was taken for Gefion's conversion. The ship's magazines and most of her machinery spaces were converted into cargo holds. With her new diesel engines, which had come from the unfinished U-boats U-115 and U-116, she could steam at 11 knots (20 km/h; 13 mph) and had a cargo capacity of 2,600 t (2,560 long tons; 2,870 short tons). The conversion was not particularly successful, and was only done due to a severe shortage of shipping in the aftermath of the war. This was in large part a result of the narrowness of her hull, and the significant amount of internal compartmentalization, which hampered her use as a freighter. As a result, Adolf Sommerfeld served only very briefly, and was broken up for scrap by Danziger Hoch- und Tiefbau in Danzig in 1923.
