= SM U-115 =

Type U 115 U-boat of the Imperial German Navy

History

German Empire
- Name: U-115
- Builder: Schichau-Werke, Elbing
- Cost: 4,100,000 Goldmark
- Yard number: 987
- Laid down: September 1916
- Launched: 1918
- Fate: never completed, broken up at Danzig

General characteristics
- Class & type: German Type U 115 submarine
- Displacement: 882 t (868 long tons) surfaced; 1,233 t (1,214 long tons) submerged
- Length: 72.30 m (237 ft 2 in)
- Beam: 6.50 m (21 ft 4 in)
- Draught: 4 m (13 ft 1 in)
- Propulsion: 2 shafts; 2 × MAN four-stroke diesel motors with 2,400 PS (1,770 kW; 2,370 shp); 2 × SSW double dynamos with 1,200 PS (880 kW; 1,180 shp); 450 rpm surfaced; 330 rpm submerged
- Speed: 16 knots (30 km/h; 18 mph) surfaced; 9 knots (17 km/h; 10 mph) submerged
- Range: 11,470 nautical miles (21,240 km; 13,200 mi) at 8 kn surfaced; 60 nautical miles (110 km; 69 mi) at 4.5 kn submerged
- Test depth: 50 m (160 ft)
- Complement: 4 officers, 32 men
- Armament: 6 × 45 cm (18 in) torpedo tubes (4 bow, 2 stern); 1 ×10.5 cm (4.1 in) L/45 and; 1 × 8.8 cm (3.5 in) L/30 deck gun

SM U-115 (Note: "SM" stands for "Seiner Majestät" (English: His Majesty's) and combined with the U for Unterseeboot would be translated as His Majesty's Submarine.) was a German Type U 115 U-boat (Projekt 43) of the Imperial German Navy built at Schichau-Werke, Elbing. As her sister ship SM U-116, she was never completed and ultimately broken up in Danzig after the armistice. Her main engines were used in M/S Adolf Sommerfeld ex SMS Gefion. Both boats had been offered to the IGN free of charge by Schichau in an attempt to gain experience in building submarines. When construction of the two boats began to lag behind due to shortages in raw materials and lack of experience in submarine construction, they were declared "war boats" (Kriegsboote), formally ordered by the Reichsmarineamt and given their respective designation. Though 14 more boats of the class were ordered on 29 June 1918 for delivery in 1919, on 20 October 1918, Schichau-Werke reported U 115 would not be ready for delivery until the spring of 1919. None of the 16 planned units would be complete before the end of the war.
