= SMS Seeadler (1892) =

Unprotected cruiser of the German Imperial Navy

Coordinates: 53°29′N 8°12′E

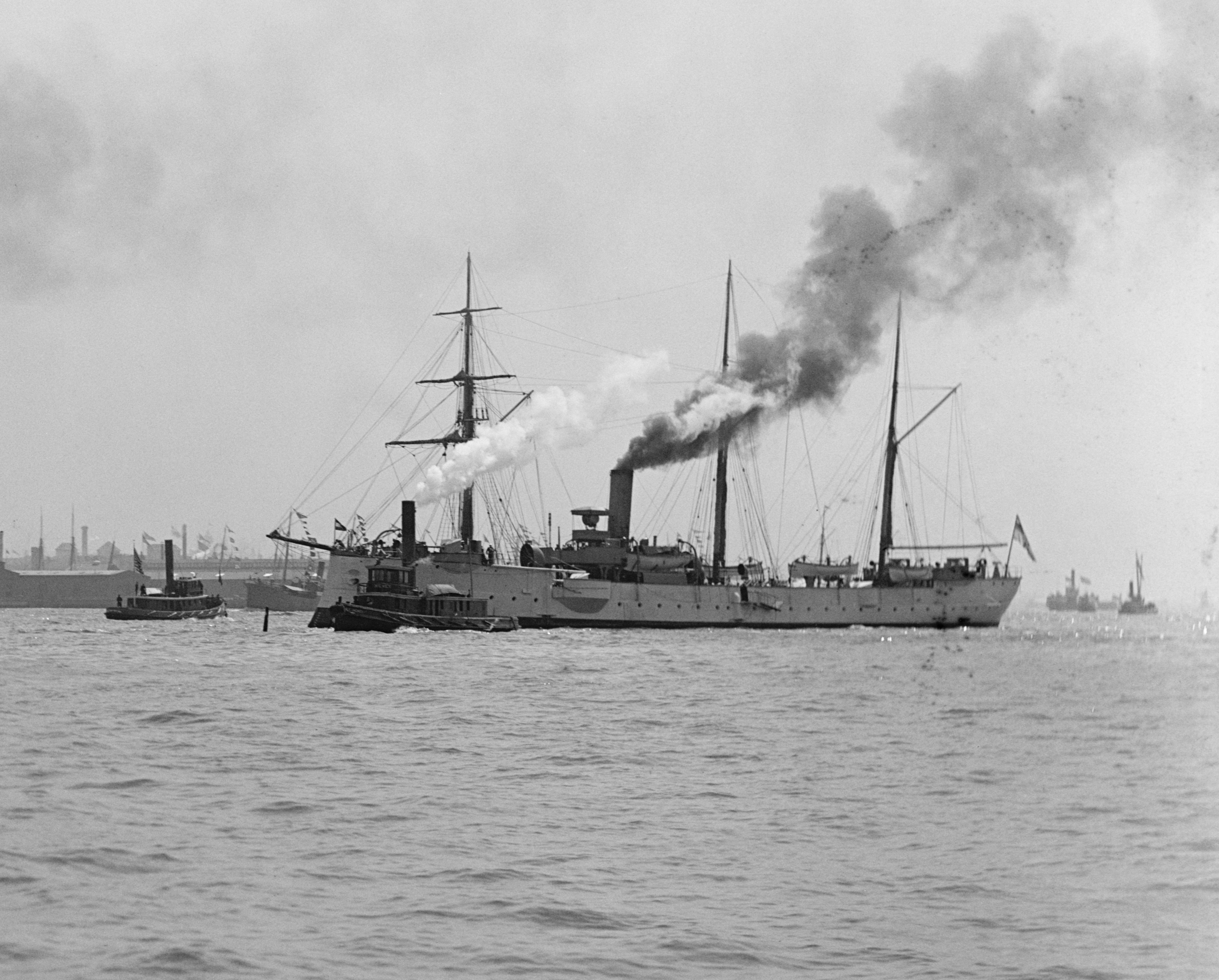
- SMS Seeadler at New York, 1893

History

German Empire
- Name: Seeadler
- Namesake: Sea eagle
- Builder: Kaiserliche Werft Danzig
- Laid down: 1890
- Launched: 2 February 1892
- Commissioned: 17 August 1892
- Fate: Exploded at Wilhelmshaven 19 April 1917 while being used as a mine hulk

General characteristics
- Class & type: Bussard-class cruiser
- Displacement: Normal: 1,612 t (1,587 long tons); Full load: 1,864 t (1,835 long tons)
- Length: 82.60 m (271 ft)
- Beam: 12.70 m (41 ft 8 in)
- Draft: 4.42 m (14 ft 6 in)
- Installed power: 4 × fire-tube boilers; 2,800 PS (2,800 ihp)
- Propulsion: 2 × triple-expansion steam engines; 2 × screw propellers
- Speed: 16.9 knots (31.3 km/h; 19.4 mph)
- Range: 2,950 nmi (5,460 km) at 9 knots (17 km/h)
- Complement: 9 officers; 152 enlisted men
- Armament: 8 × 10.5 cm (4.1 in) SK L/35 guns; 5 × 3.7 cm (1.5 in) Hotchkiss revolver cannon; 2 × 35 cm (13.8 in) torpedo tubes

SMS Seeadler ("His Majesty's Ship Sea Eagle") (Note: "SMS" stands for "Seiner Majestät Schiff" (German: His Majesty's Ship).) was an unprotected cruiser of the Bussard class, the third member of a class of six ships built by the German Kaiserliche Marine (Imperial Navy). Her sister ships included Bussard, the lead ship, along with Falke, Condor, Cormoran, and Geier. Seeadler was built at the Kaiserliche Werft (Imperial Shipyard) in Danzig in late 1890, launched in February 1892, and commissioned in August of that year. Intended for colonial service, Seeadler was armed with a main battery of eight 10.5-centimeter (4.1 in) guns and had a top speed of 15.5 knots (28.7 km/h; 17.8 mph).

Seeadler spent almost her entire career abroad. Following her commissioning, she joined the protected cruiser Kaiserin Augusta in 1893 on a visit to the United States for the 400th anniversary of Christopher Columbus's discovery of the Americas. She thereafter went to German East Africa, where she was stationed until 1898. She returned to Germany briefly for a modernization in 1898–1899, before being assigned to the South Seas Station in German New Guinea. During her tour in the Pacific, she participated in the suppression of the Boxer Uprising in Qing China in 1900. Her assignment in the Pacific was interrupted by the 1905 Maji-Maji Rebellion in German East Africa, which prompted the German Navy to send Seeadler there.

Seeadler remained in East Africa for the next nine years, returning to Germany finally in January 1914. She had spent over thirteen years abroad since her 1899 modernization, the longest period of continuous overseas service of any major German warship. After arriving in Germany, she was decommissioned. She was not mobilized after the outbreak of World War I in August 1914, being too old to be of any fighting value. She was instead used as a mine storage hulk outside Wilhelmshaven. On 19 April 1917, her cargo of mines exploded and destroyed the ship, though there were no casualties. Her wreck was never raised for scrapping.

== Design ==
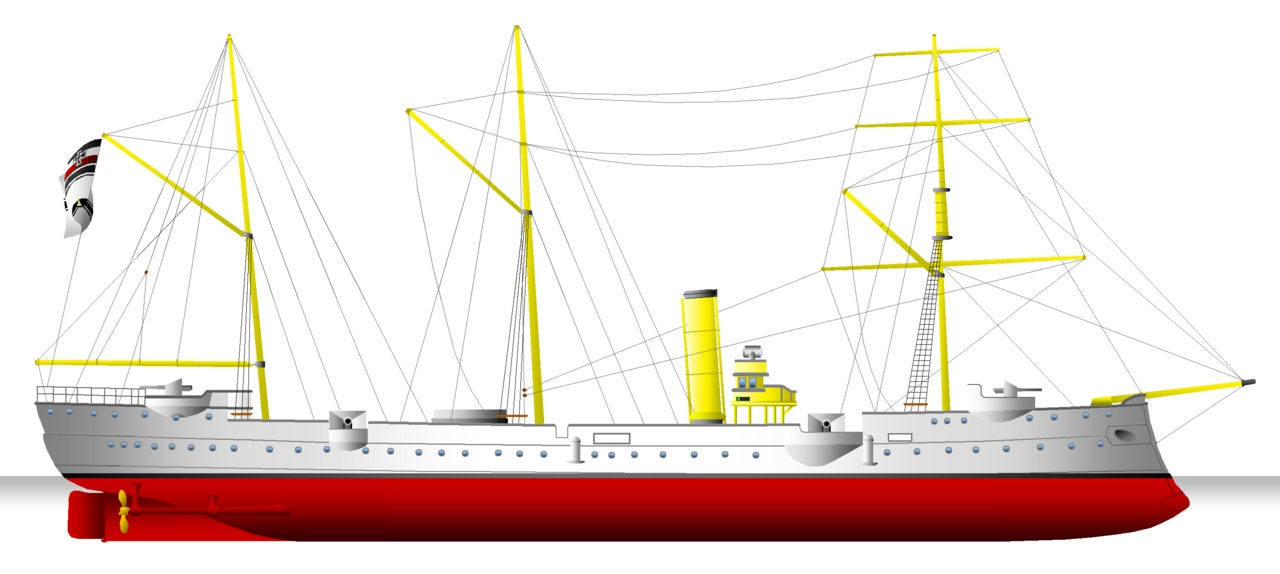
Illustration of the Bussard-class cruiser Geier

Through the 1870s and early 1880s, Germany built two types of cruising vessels: small, fast avisos suitable for service as fleet scouts and larger, long-ranged screw corvettes capable of patrolling the German colonial empire. A pair of new cruisers was authorized under the 1886–1887 fiscal year, intended for the latter purpose. General Leo von Caprivi, the Chief of the Imperial Admiralty, sought to modernize Germany's cruiser force. The first step in the program, the two Schwalbe-class unprotected cruisers, provided the basis for the larger Bussard class.

Seeadler was 82.60 meters (271 ft) long overall and had a beam of 12.70 m (41 ft 8 in) and a draft of 4.42 m (14 ft 6 in) forward. She displaced 1,612 t (1,587 long tons) normally and up to 1,864 t (1,835 long tons; 2,055 short tons) at full load. Her propulsion system consisted of two horizontal 3-cylinder triple-expansion steam engines that drove a pair of screw propellers. Steam was provided by four coal-fired cylindrical fire-tube boilers that were ducted into a single funnel. These provided a top speed of 16.9 knots (31.3 km/h; 19.4 mph) from 2,800 metric horsepower (2,800 ihp), and a range of approximately 2,950 nautical miles (5,460 km; 3,390 mi) at 9 kn (17 km/h; 10 mph). She had a crew of 9 officers and 152 enlisted men.

The ship was armed with a main battery of eight 10.5 cm (4.1 in) SK L/35 quick-firing (QF) guns in single pedestal mounts, supplied with 800 rounds of ammunition in total. They had a range of 10,800 m (35,400 ft). Two guns were placed side by side forward, two on each broadside, and two side by side aft. The gun armament was rounded out by five 3.7 cm (1.5 in) Hotchkiss revolver cannon for defense against torpedo boats. She was also equipped with two 35 cm (13.8 in) torpedo tubes with five torpedoes, both of which were mounted on the deck.

== Service history ==
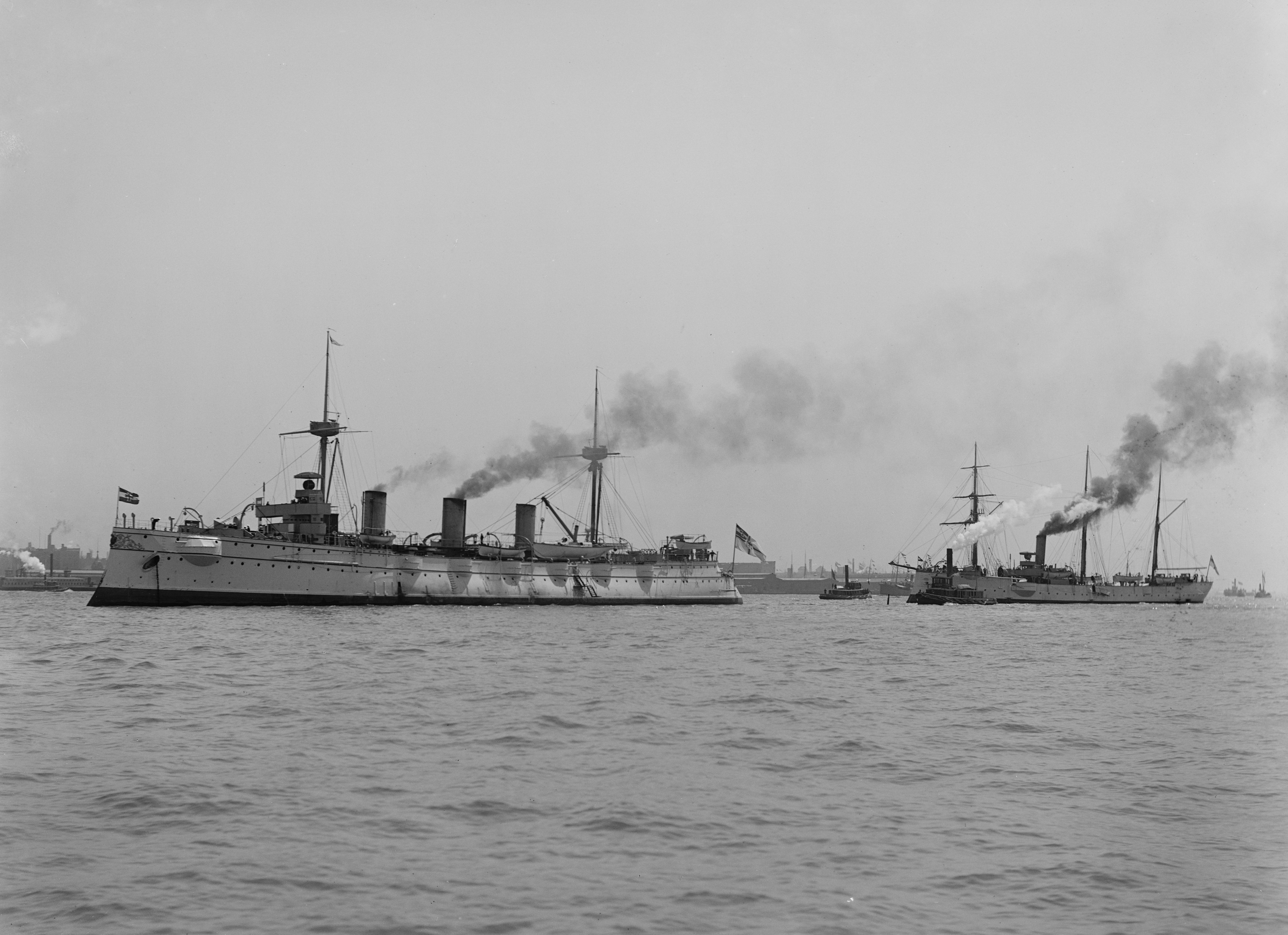
Seeadler (right) with Kaiserin Augusta in Hampton Roads

Seeadler (sea eagle) was laid down at the Kaiserliche Werft (Imperial Shipyard) in Danzig in late 1890 under the contract name "Ersatz Adler". (Note: German warships were ordered under provisional names. Additions to the fleet were given a single letter; ships intended to replace older or lost vessels were ordered as "Ersatz (name of the ship to be replaced)".) She was launched on 2 February 1892, originally named Kaiseradler (Eastern imperial eagle). The shipyard director, Kapitän zur See (Captain) Ernst Aschmann, gave the launching speech. She was completed by 27 June 1892, when she was commissioned into the Imperial German Navy. The ship was renamed on 17 August when she was commissioned, since Kaiser Wilhelm II decided to rename his first yacht Kaiseradler instead. Seeadler began her sea trials the same day. On 25 October, she was accidentally rammed by the armored corvette Bayern in Kiel, but she suffered only light damage. Her trials lasted until 17 November; she formally entered service with the fleet on 15 March 1893.

After her commissioning, Seeadler was slated to replace Schwalbe in the East African Station in German East Africa. But first, Seeadler and the protected cruiser Kaiserin Augusta conducted a goodwill visit to the United States, a belated celebration of the 400th anniversary of Columbus's first voyage across the Atlantic. The ships left Kiel on 25 March, but due to a mistaken estimate for the amount of coal that would be necessary to cross the Atlantic, Seeadler ran out of fuel while en route. Kaiserin Augusta took the cruiser under tow to Halifax, where she refilled her coal bunkers. The two cruisers reached Hampton Roads on 18 April. Ships from nine other navies, including the US Navy, arrived for a major celebration in New York harbor that was reviewed by Grover Cleveland, the President of the United States. Seeadler's yacht-like appearance attracted particular attention.

=== Deployment to East Africa ===
After the conclusion of the festivities in the United States, Seeadler steamed back across the Atlantic to the Azores, before proceeding into the Mediterranean Sea and then into the Red Sea. There, she met Schwalbe at Aden on 20 June. Seeadler proceeded to Bombay, India, for routine maintenance that lasted from 3 July to 21 August. The cruiser finally arrived on station on 2 September when she dropped anchor in Zanzibar and met the survey ship Möwe, the other vessel on the East Africa Station. On 9 September both ships went to Kilwa; a group of slave traders had attacked the small police force detachment stationed there. The colonial army, the Schutztruppe (protection force), was unavailable to reinforce the police troops, and so Seeadler and Möwe bombarded the slavers and neutralized the threat.

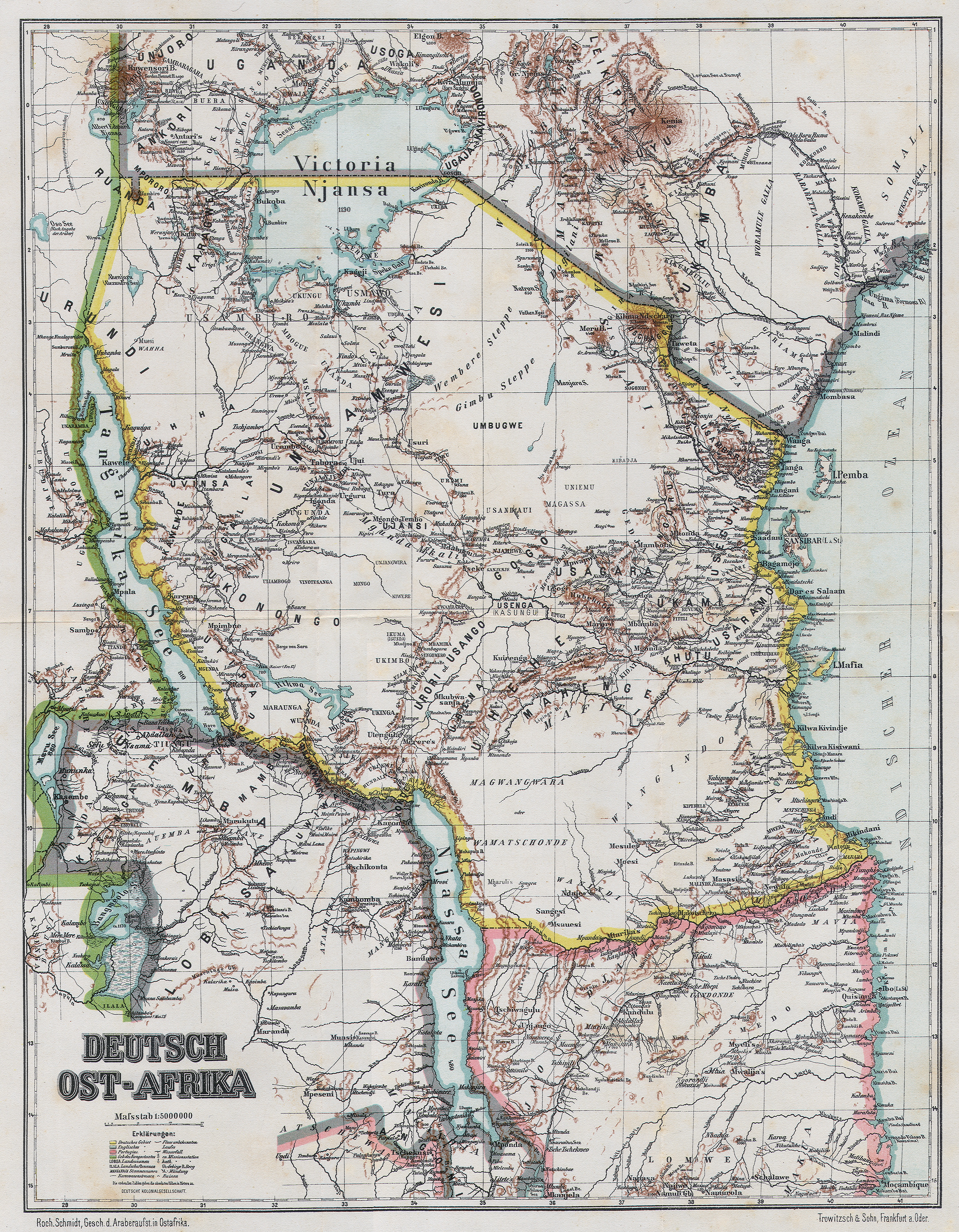
Contemporary map of German East Africa

Seeadler proceeded to Lourenço Marques in Portuguese Moçambique. A rebellion in the Portuguese colony threatened German nationals residing in the city; Seeadler evacuated the civilians and took them to Zanzibar, where they arrived on 15 November. During this period, Möwe was transferred to German New Guinea, and Seeadler's sister ships Condor and Cormoran arrived in German East Africa. Condor was to reinforce Seeadler and Cormoran was to continue on to the Pacific, but the latter remained in the area temporarily to strengthen the German naval force in the region. This was done both to observe the damage to German economic interests in Moçambique and as a show of force to prevent British encroachment on Delagoa Bay, which was the only supply port for the independent Transvaal. In January 1895, Condor took over Seeadler's role on the East African coast.

On 10 January, Seeadler departed for Bombay, where her boilers were repaired in a major overhaul. Workers from the Kaiserliche Werft in Kiel were sent to do the work. Seeadler was back in service by May, and on 18 May she departed Bombay, arriving in East Africa on 31 May. Cormoran was meanwhile detached from East Africa and allowed to continue to the Pacific. The rest of the year was uneventful for Seeadler, though she became briefly involved in political developments in East Africa. The British Jameson Raid into the Transvaal in December 1895 threatened some 15,000 German nationals in the Transvaal, along with the investment of 500 million gold marks in the country. The German governor considered ordering Seeadler to contribute a landing force to protect the German consul in Pretoria, the capital of the Transvaal, but the defeat of the Jameson Raid rendered the plan redundant. Seeadler nevertheless remained in East Africa while tensions cooled. In mid-February 1896, she went to Cape Town for her yearly overhaul.

After completing her repairs, Seeadler was ordered to German South-West Africa on 28 April to assist the Schutztruppe in suppressing a local rebellion. The ship was tasked with interrupting the shipment of weapons from British arms dealers to the rebels. Seeadler thereafter proceeded to Swakopmund on 5 May; she was joined there by the gunboat Hyäne. The two ships sent forces ashore to defend the city. At the end of the month, Seeadler returned to East Africa. On 2 October, she steamed to Zanzibar to take the deposed Sultan Khalid bin Barghash to Dar es Salaam following the brief Anglo-Zanzibar War. On 20 December, Seeadler was again called to Lourenço Marques after the German consul Graf von Pfeil was attacked by Portuguese colonial police. Condor joined her there on 2 January 1897 to strengthen the show of force. Seeadler thereafter proceeded to Cape Town for her yearly overhaul.

The following two years proceeded uneventfully. In January 1898, Seeadler again returned to Cape Town for an overhaul before being ordered to return to Germany on 3 May. She left Dar es Salaam three days later and arrived in Aden on 31 May. There she met Schwalbe, which was replacing her in East Africa. Seeadler returned to Kiel on 26 June, and she was placed out of service on 9 July for a major overhaul in Danzig. The work was done at the Kaiserliche Werft, and the changes included removing the main mast and cutting down her rigging to a topsail schooner rig. On 3 October 1899, Seeadler was recommissioned and was ordered to replace her sister Falke on the South Seas Station in German New Guinea. She departed Kiel on 19 October and stopped in Tangiers on 27–28 October to force restitution from the Moroccan government for damage to German interests. Seeadler then proceeded to Germany's south-Pacific colonies, arriving on 15 November.

=== Deployment to the Pacific ===
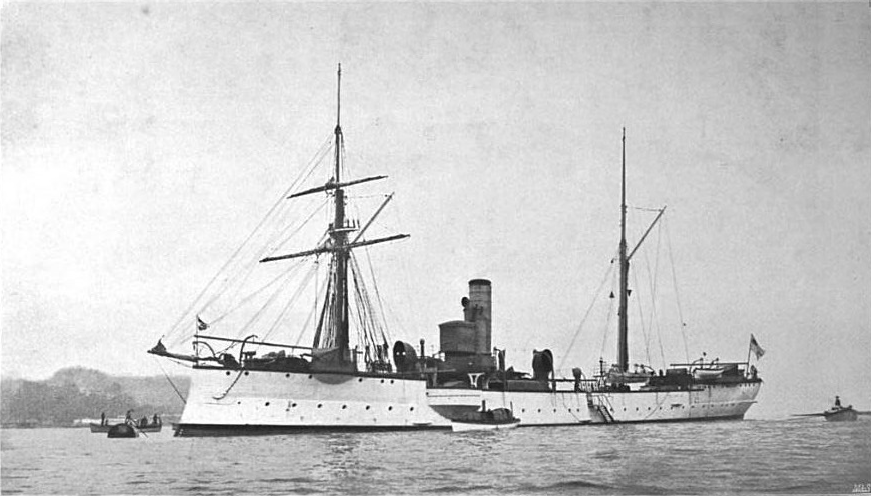
Seeadler, c. 1899

Following her arrival in the Pacific, Seeadler first went to the Admiralty Islands on 18 January 1900 in response to the murder of European businessmen by natives there. Starting on 30 January, she took a cruise to tour the German holdings in the area that lasted for several weeks. Stops included the Caroline Islands and the Mariana Islands, both of which had been recently purchased from Spain. In May, a cruise to German Samoa followed; there she met Cormoran. The two ships then toured the islands with the governor of German Samoa, Wilhelm Solf, and the Samoan chief, Mata'afa Iosefo, aboard Seeadler. In July 1900, following the outbreak of the Boxer Uprising in Qing China the previous year, Seeadler was sent from the South Seas Station to assist in the Western suppression of the Boxers. She arrived in Qingdao in the Kiautschou Bay Leased Territory and joined the ships of the East Asia Squadron. She spent the following months off Chinese harbors with the armored cruiser Fürst Bismarck and the protected cruiser Hertha.

On 24 April 1901, Seeadler was ordered to steam to the island of Yap in the Carolines to assist the stranded Norddeutscher Lloyd postal steamer SS München. A pair of tugboats had managed to pull the steamer free by the time Seeadler arrived on 3 May, though the cruiser's crew assisted with repairs to the ship's damaged hull. Seeadler thereafter returned to East Asia and resumed her patrols of Chinese harbors, though during this period she also visited Japanese harbors as well. These duties lasted until the end of 1902. During Seeadler's operations in China, her crew suffered only one casualty from enemy action. On 2 January 1903, her sister Bussard arrived to take her place in East Asian waters, allowing Seeadler to return to the South Seas Station. Seeadler underwent a periodic overhaul in Uraga, outside Tokyo, Japan, from 3 August to 14 September.

Following the outbreak of the Russo-Japanese War in February 1904, Seeadler was recalled to Qingdao to be prepared for any possible hostilities involving Germany. During this period, Cormoran was replaced by Condor; the two cruisers were joined by Seeadler's old consort from East Africa, the survey vessel Möwe. In early 1905, Seeadler conducted goodwill visits to the Philippines and the Dutch East Indies (now Indonesia), before returning to Qingdao in April. On 28 June, with the Russo-Japanese War winding down following the decisive Japanese victory at the Battle of Tsushima, Seeadler was detached from the East Asia Squadron, permitting her return to the South Seas Station. While en route to her station area, Seeadler received an order to return to Africa during a stop at Ponape on 20 August. Her presence was necessary there to help put down a major uprising, the Maji Maji Rebellion, that had broken out in July. Seeadler ran aground twice, at Labuan and Singapore, on her way to East Africa, but neither incident resulted in damage to the ship. She arrived in Dar es Salaam on 1 October.

=== Return to East Africa ===
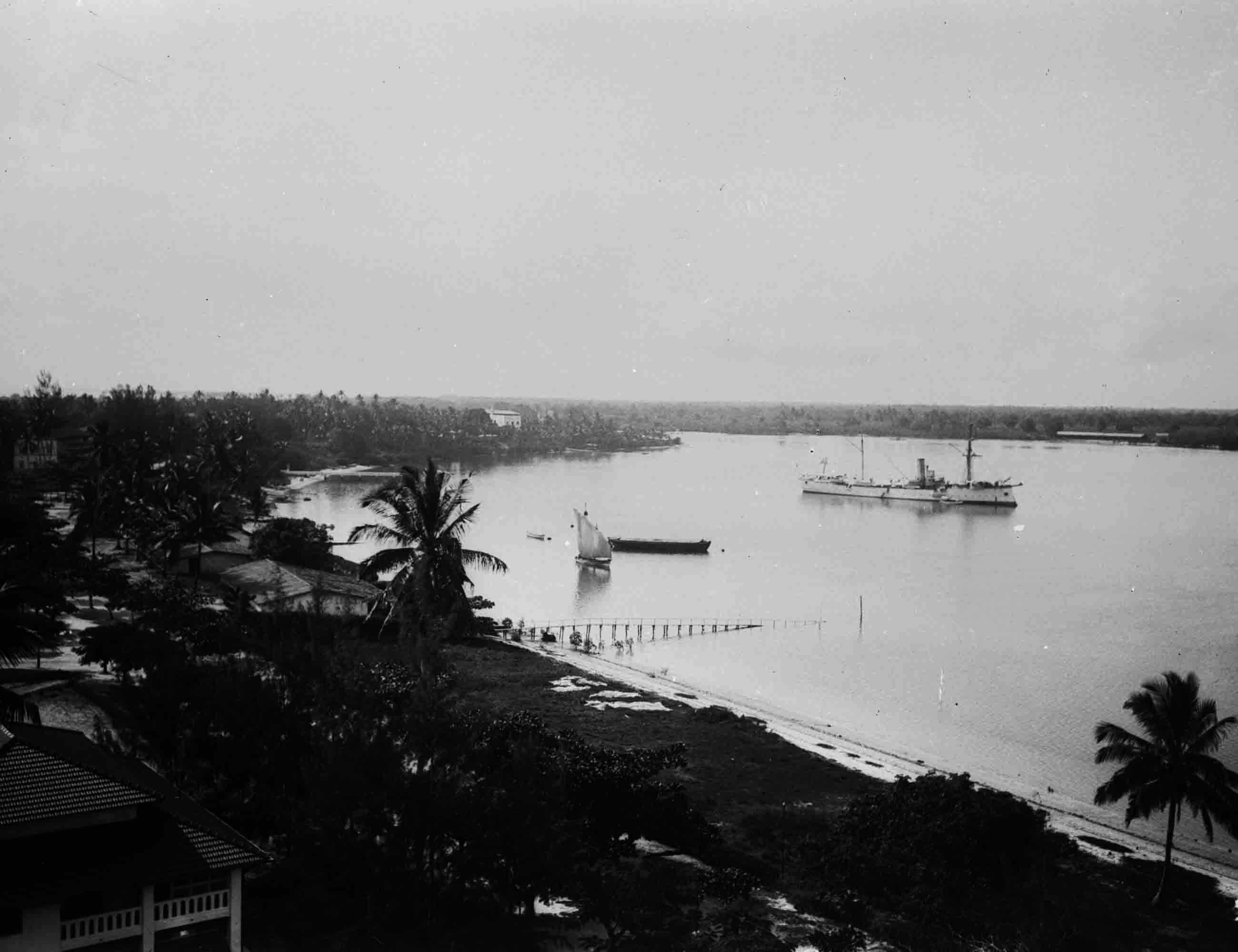
Seeadler in Dar es Salaam during her second deployment

In mid-October 1905, Seeadler sent a landing party ashore at Samanga to protect the coastal telegraph line there. By mid-December, she had returned to Dar es Salaam, before proceeding to Kilwa on 17 January 1906. The cruiser was back in Dar es Salaam on 24 January. Another overhaul at Cape Town followed from 10 February to 16 March. By this time, the situation in East Africa had calmed, and the light cruiser Thetis, which had also been sent to suppress the Maji-Maji uprising, was sent back to Germany. Seeadler nevertheless remained in the region, and was formally assigned to the East Africa Station in early 1907. In October 1907, then-Korvettenkapitän (Lieutenant Commander) Hugo Meurer served as the ship's commanding officer. He would hold the position until June 1909.

In 1908, Seeadler was joined by Bussard on the East Africa Station. From 18 February to 18 March, Seeadler underwent another overhaul at Cape Town. She thereafter proceeded to German South-West Africa, stopping in Walvis Bay and Swakopmund. There, she cruised with the gunboat Panther in March and early April. On 18 April, she was back in Dar es Salaam. Another period of dockyard repairs followed from 12 to 26 September, this time in Bombay. The rest of 1908 continued uneventfully for Seeadler, as did the next few years. The only significant event came in early November 1911, when Seeadler pulled the Hamburg-Bremen-Afrika Linie steamer SS Irmgard free after she ran aground off Quelimane. In 1913, the mayor of Cape Town hosted delegations from Seeadler and the British protected cruiser HMS Hermes. And at the end of December, the princes Leopold and Georg of Bavaria visited Seeadler in Dar es Salaam while on an overseas tour.

=== Later service ===
On 9 January 1914, Seeadler departed East Africa for the last time, bound for Germany. She had spent nearly thirteen and a half years abroad, the longest uninterrupted period of overseas service of any major German warship. Her replacement, her sister Geier, had not yet arrived but was en route. Seeadler stopped in Aden on 22 January, and arrived in Kiel on 18 March. She was then moved to Danzig and decommissioned. On 6 May 1914, she was reclassified as a gunboat. After the outbreak of World War I in August 1914, she was reduced to a hulk for storing naval mines since she was no longer fit for active service. She was towed to Wilhelmshaven and anchored in the outer roadstead. On 19 April 1917, her cargo exploded while she was moored in the Jade outside Wilhelmshaven. The explosion destroyed the ship, but there were no casualties; her wreck was never raised.
