= Bussard (ship) =

Several naval ships of Germany were named Bussard after the buteo (German: Bussard):

- SMS Bussard (cruiser): 1,650 ton Bussard-class light cruiser, launched 1890
- Bussard (S25): Seeadler-class (Type 141) fast attack craft, commissioned 1959 to 1975
- Bussard (S64): Albatros-class (Type 143) fast attack craft, decommissioned
