= SMS Seeadler =

Two ships of the Imperial German navy were named Seeadler:

- SMS Seeadler (1892), an unprotected cruiser launched in 1892 and sunk in 1917
- SMS Seeadler (1915), an auxiliary cruiser commissioned in 1915 and wrecked in 1917
