= SMS Falke (1891) =

Unprotected cruiser of the German Imperial Navy

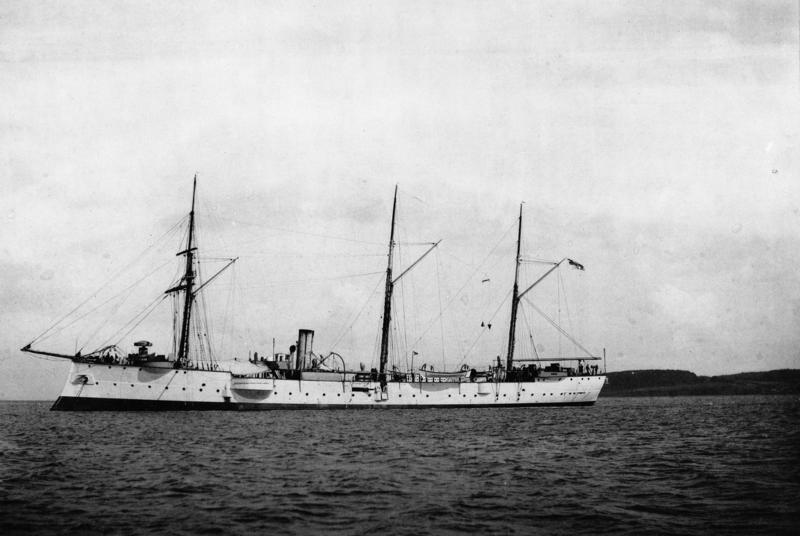
- SMS Falke in 1892

History

German Empire
- Name: Falke
- Namesake: Falke
- Laid down: January 1890
- Launched: 4 April 1891
- Commissioned: 14 September 1891
- Decommissioned: 20 January 1908
- Fate: Scrapped, 1913

General characteristics
- Class & type: Bussard-class cruiser
- Displacement: Normal: 1,559 t (1,534 long tons); Full load: 1,868 t (1,838 long tons)
- Length: 82.6 m (271 ft)
- Beam: 12.5 m (41 ft)
- Draft: 4.45 m (14 ft 7 in)
- Installed power: 4 × fire-tube boilers; 2,800 PS (2,800 ihp)
- Propulsion: 2 × triple-expansion steam engines; 2 × screw propellers
- Speed: 15.5 knots (28.7 km/h; 17.8 mph)
- Range: 2,990 nmi (5,540 km) at 9 knots (17 km/h)
- Complement: 9 officers; 152 enlisted men
- Armament: 8 × 10.5 cm (4.1 in) SK L/35 guns; 5 × 3.7 cm (1.5 in) Hotchkiss revolver cannon; 2 × 35 cm (13.8 in) torpedo tubes

SMS Falke ("His Majesty's Ship Falke—Falcon") (Note: "SMS" stands for "Seiner Majestät Schiff" (German: His Majesty's Ship).) was an unprotected cruiser of the Bussard class, built for the Imperial German Navy. She was the second member of the class of six vessels. The cruiser was laid down in 1890, launched in April 1891, and commissioned into the fleet in September of that month. Designed for overseas service, she carried a main battery of eight 10.5-centimeter (4.1 in) guns and had a top speed of 15.5 knots (28.7 km/h; 17.8 mph).

Falke served abroad for the majority of her career, seeing duty in East Asia, the Central Pacific, and the Americas. She assisted in the suppression of a revolt in Samoa in 1893, and was damaged in a later uprising there in 1899. In 1901, Falke was transferred to the American Station, and the following year she took part in the Venezuela Crisis of 1902–03, during which she helped enforce an Anglo-German blockade of the Venezuelan coast. In 1907, Falke was recalled to Germany. She was stricken from the naval register in late 1912 and subsequently broken up for scrap.

== Design ==
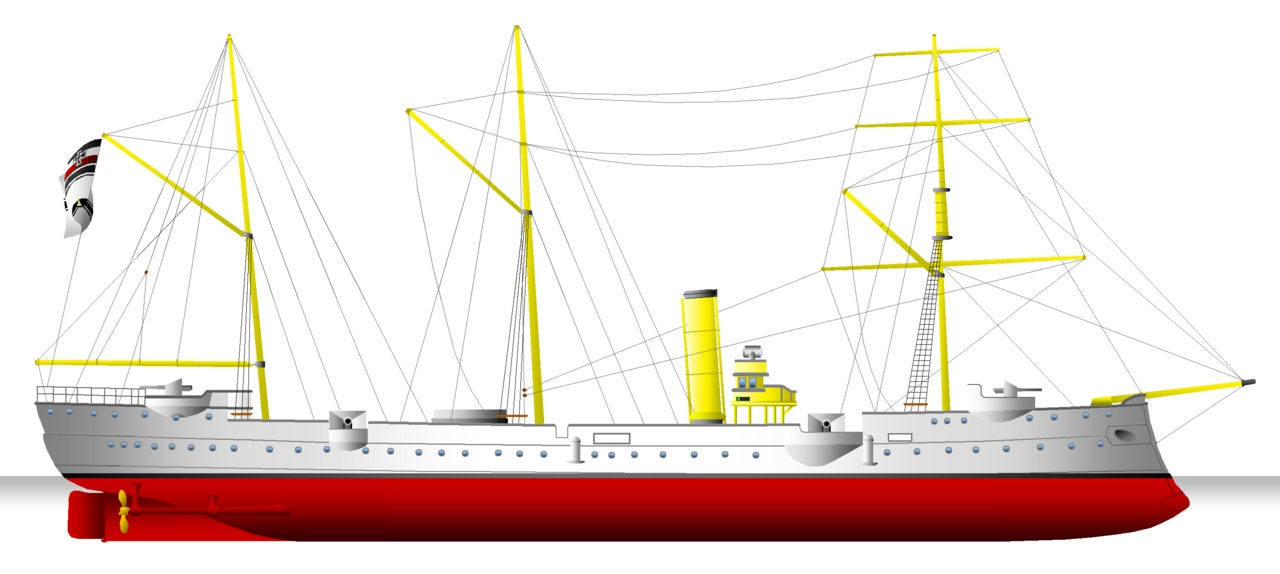
Illustration of the Bussard-class cruiser Geier

Through the 1870s and early 1880s, Germany built two types of cruising vessels: small, fast avisos suitable for service as fleet scouts and larger, long-ranged screw corvettes capable of patrolling the German colonial empire. A pair of new cruisers was authorized under the 1886–1887 fiscal year, intended for the latter purpose. General Leo von Caprivi, the Chief of the Imperial Admiralty, sought to modernize Germany's cruiser force. The first step in the program, the two Schwalbe-class unprotected cruisers, provided the basis for the larger Bussard class.

Falke was 82.6 meters (271 ft) long overall and had a beam of 12.5 m (41 ft) and a draft of 4.45 m (14.6 ft) forward. She displaced 1,559 t (1,534 long tons) normally and up to 1,868 t (1,838 long tons; 2,059 short tons) at full load. Her propulsion system consisted of two horizontal 3-cylinder triple-expansion steam engines that drove a pair of screw propellers. Steam was provided by four coal-fired cylindrical fire-tube boilers that were ducted into a single funnel. These provided a top speed of 15.5 knots (28.7 km/h; 17.8 mph) from 2,800 metric horsepower (2,800 ihp), and a range of approximately 2,990 nautical miles (5,540 km; 3,440 mi) at 9 kn (17 km/h; 10 mph). She had a crew of 9 officers and 152 enlisted men.

The ship was armed with a main battery of eight 10.5 cm (4.1 in) SK L/35 quick-firing guns in single pedestal mounts, supplied with 800 rounds of ammunition in total. They had a range of 10,800 m (35,400 ft). Two guns were placed side by side forward, two on each broadside in sponsons, and two side by side aft. The gun armament was rounded out by five 3.7 cm (1.5 in) Hotchkiss revolver cannon for defense against torpedo boats. She was also equipped with two 35 cm (13.8 in) torpedo tubes with five torpedoes, both of which were mounted on the deck.

== Service history ==
Falke was laid down at the Kaiserliche Werft (Imperial Shipyard) in Kiel in January 1890 under the contract name "D". (Note: German warships were ordered under provisional names. Additions to the fleet were given a single letter; ships intended to replace older or lost vessels were ordered as "Ersatz (name of the ship to be replaced)".) She was launched on 4 April 1891; at the ceremony, Prince Heinrich gave a speech and his wife, Princess Irene, christened the ship. Falke was commissioned on 14 September of that year for sea trials. While steaming off Bornholm, the ship ran aground but was pulled free by other vessels. She was temporarily decommissioned in Kiel on 31 October. Falke was recommissioned on 14 August 1892 in order to participate in the annual fleet training maneuvers that began that month and continued into September. She was assigned to the III Division, along with the coastal defense ship Siegfried.

=== Deployment to West Africa ===
Germany's African colonies

Falke was transferred to Germany's West African colonies in western Africa after the conclusion of the maneuvers, departing Kiel on 16 October to replace the gunboat Habicht. After arriving in western Africa, Falke went to Dahomey, where the Second Franco-Dahomean War had recently broken out. In December, her captain unsuccessfully attempted to negotiate the release of two German merchants who were being held by Dahomean soldiers. On 31 December, Falke returned to Duala, the main German port in Kamerun, where she joined the second warship stationed in the colony, the gunboat Hyäne.

The borders of German South-West Africa had been settled via treaties with Portugal (1886) and Britain (1890), but the coast line had not been surveyed in detail. Falke was tasked with locating a suitable port to connect to the capital at Windhuk. She departed Luanda on 23 January 1893 and arrived in Cape Cross four days later. The ship surveyed the area thoroughly, and discovered a Portuguese padrão. It had been placed there by the Portuguese explorer Diogo Cão in the late 15th century. Falke's crew removed it to protect it from further weathering and placed a wooden cross to mark the location. The ship's crew received a period of rest from 14 to 16 March, after which time Falke steamed back to Kamerun, stopping in several ports along the way and arriving in Duala on 29 April. There, the stone monument was unloaded and later transported back to Berlin for preservation by the steamer Stettin, which departed Duala on 29 October. A granite copy, carried by the cruiser Sperber, was installed in its place in 1895.

In the meantime, Falke had been sent to Liberia on 27 May in response to unrest in the country. She arrived in Monrovia on 9 June, and temporarily took Joseph James Cheeseman, the President of Liberia, aboard to protect him from the rebels. Falke was back in Duala by 22 July. She was sent to Cape Town in South Africa for an overhaul that began on 30 November, but a rebellion among the Khoikhoi in German South-West Africa forced a postponement of the work; by 5 December the ship was in the colony to join the effort to suppress the rebels. Her presence proved to be unnecessary, and so she was sent back to Cape Town later in the month. After she arrived, the Admiralstab (Admiralty Staff) transferred Falke to the colony in German New Guinea. Falke departed on 23 December, arriving in Melbourne via Sydney.

=== Deployment to the Pacific ===
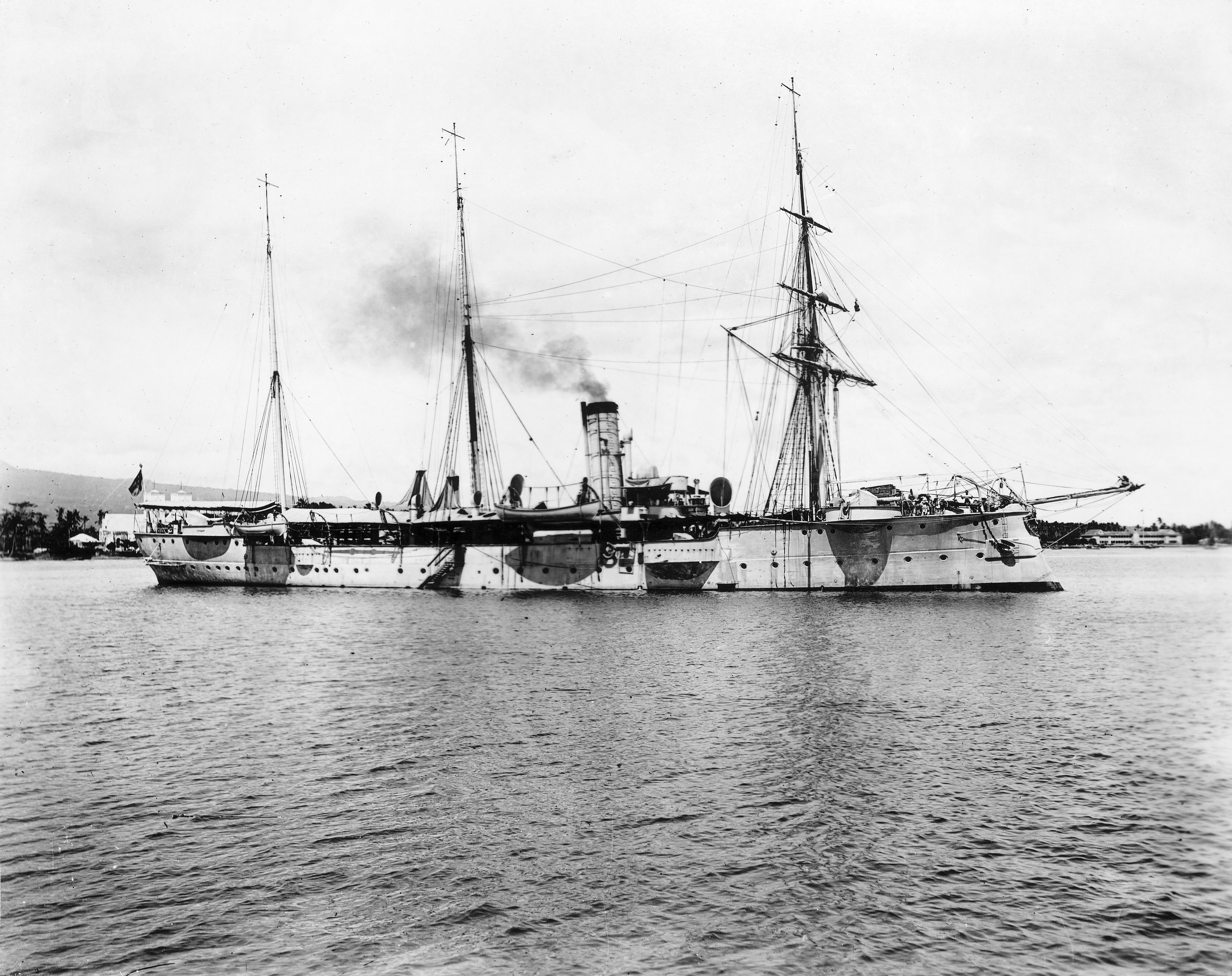
Falke in Samoa

Upon arriving in Melbourne on 8 February 1894, Falke met her sister ship Bussard and the gunboat Möwe. The three ships then departed for Apia in the Caroline Islands, arriving on 16 April, where they conducted gunnery training. Falke remained in Samoa until early October when she returned to Sydney for repair work; at the time, Sydney possessed the only shipyard with the facilities necessary for major repairs, which meant that the Germans were dependent on the Australian port to keep their warships operational. A lengthy overhaul took place in Sydney from March to July 1895. From 29 July to 10 November, Falke was again in Samoa. During this period, the ship surveyed the port at Salua, north of the main island of Upolu. In mid-November, the governor of the Marshall Islands requested the presence of Falke, and in late December she left the Marshalls for Kaiser-Wilhelmsland, arriving in Matupi Harbor in January 1896. There she met Möwe; Falke's tour of Germany's Pacific colonies ended that month.

Another overhaul in Sydney followed from 4 February to 4 April. On 15 April, Falke dropped anchor once again in Apia. At the end of August, the ship steamed to Auckland, New Zealand, where she met Bussard and Möwe. The threat of rebellion in the Marshalls forced Falke to make another trip there in early November. Her cruise through the colonies ended with a stop in Sydney on 18 February 1897. She departed for another visit to Auckland on 23 April. She also stopped in Tonga before continuing on to Apia, arriving on 16 May. The following month, three Germans, including Curt von Hagen, the governor of the colony, were murdered in Kaiser-Wilhelmsland. Falke was sent to Stephansort (south of modern Madang) on 24 June to apprehend the murderers; she transported a police detachment from the capital at Herbertshöhe to Ali Island and contributed a landing party from her crew. On 10 November Falke returned to Apia, but two days later she departed for Sydney via Auckland for repairs. A new crew had also arrived in Sydney from Germany. On 24 April 1898, she departed Sydney for a tour of the colonies. After the conclusion of the cruise, Falke returned to Sydney, where her new commander, Korvettenkapitän (Corvette Captain) Victor Schönfelder had arrived; he formally took control of the ship on 1 September.

Falke c. 1899

On 1 October, Falke left Sydney for Apia before making visits to the New Hebrides, Fiji, and Tonga on the 15th. Four weeks later, Bussard departed the central Pacific, bound for Germany; Falke was now alone in the region, despite the rising international tensions concerning a succession crisis in Samoa. In March 1899, Falke was in the harbor at Apia. Unrest on the island, instigated by Mata'afa Iosefo, prompted the American cruiser USS Philadelphia and the British sloop HMS Royalist and torpedo cruiser HMS Porpoise to shell the rebel positions. Their gunfire was poorly aimed, however, and several shells hit Falke. Schönfelder kept his crew from escalating the situation to prevent a more serious diplomatic crisis from developing. Eventually, the Second Samoan Civil War was resolved by splitting the islands into German and American colonies, while Britain received concessions elsewhere. By June, the fighting was over and the situation had calmed.

Falke's sister ship Cormoran arrived at that time to relieve her. Falke then began the journey back to Germany on 1 July, stopping in Sydney, Batavia, Colombo, Mahé, and Lisbon. She reached Hamburg on 14 October. Her crew conducted a landing exercise to demonstrate how they had practiced it during their tour abroad. Kaiser Wilhelm II greeted Schönfelder and congratulated him for his skillful and levelheaded handling of the crisis in Samoa. On 27 October, Falke steamed to Danzig, where she was decommissioned on 3 November. The Kaiserliche Werft in Danzig conducted a lengthy overhaul and modernization.

=== Deployment to the Americas ===
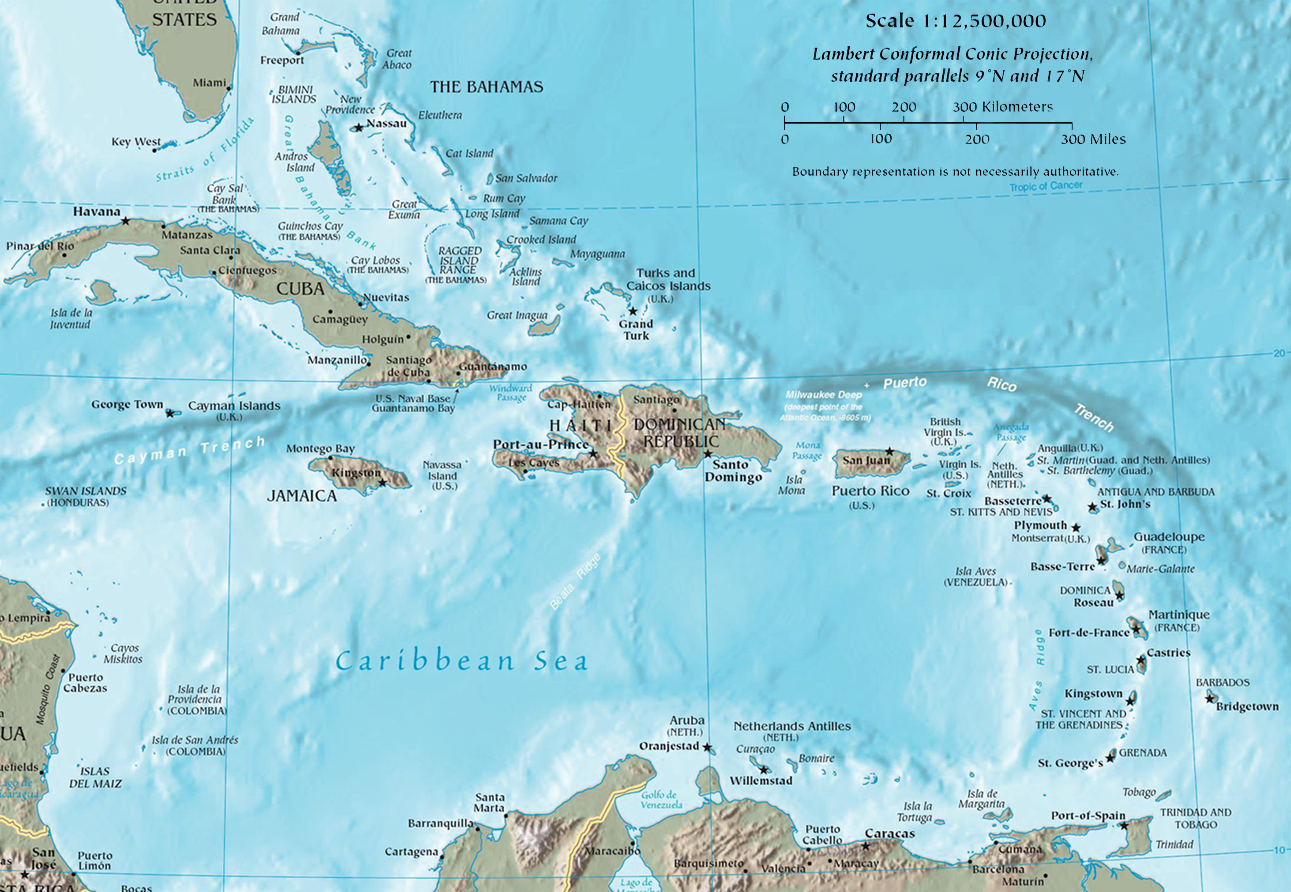
Map of the Caribbean showing many of the ports Falke visited during her deployment

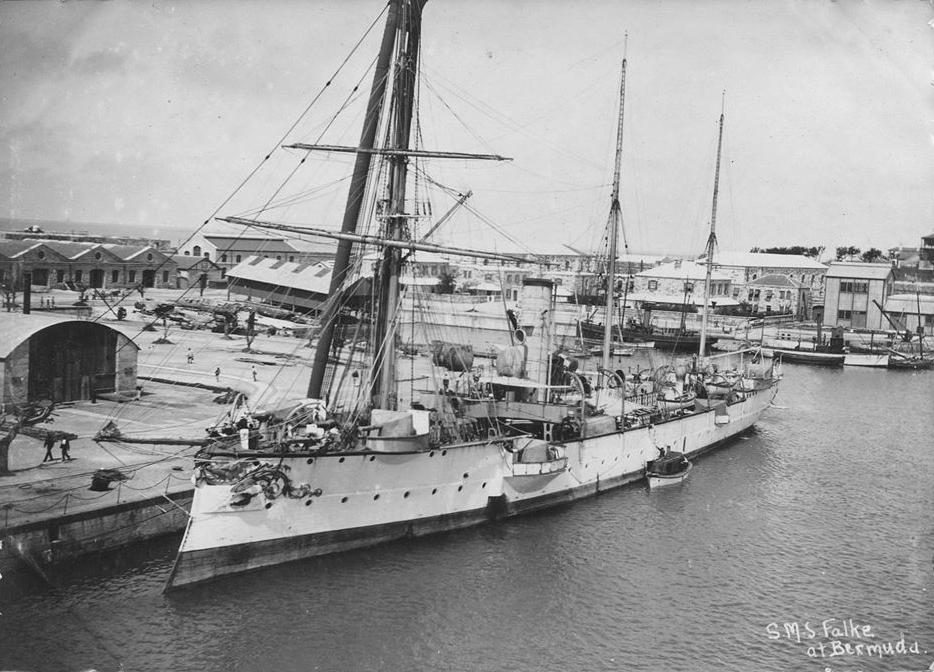
SMS Falke at the Royal Naval Dockyard Bermuda in 1903

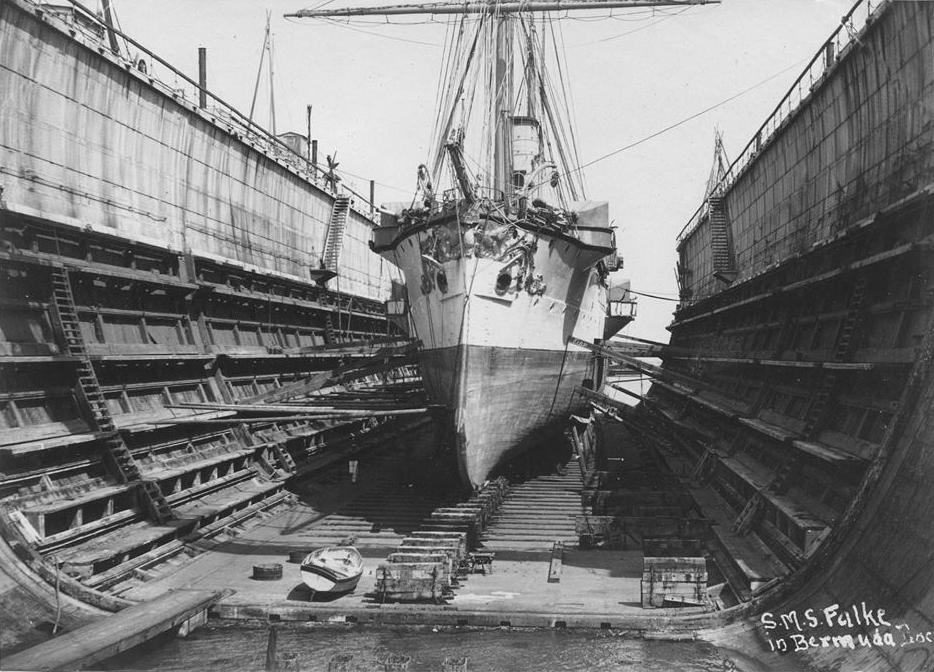
SMS Falke in the floating drydock Bermuda at the Royal Naval Dockyard Bermuda in 1903

On 2 October 1901, Falke was recommissioned for another tour abroad, this time to the Americas. She was sent to reinforce the protected cruiser Vineta due to unrest in the Caribbean and South America. Three days later, she departed Neufahrwasser and crossed the Atlantic, arriving in Castries on Saint Lucia on 14 November. Falke visited several ports in the area before joining the training ships Moltke and Stein and the light cruiser Gazelle. Falke was then ordered to steam up the Amazon River; she entered the Amazon via the Pará River on 7 March 1902 and reached Manaus by 23 March. There, she met several HAPAG and NDL steamers. Falke continued upriver, her voyage hampered by a lack of accurate maps and insufficiently knowledgeable river pilots. She finally reached San Ignacio in Peru on 17 April. By this point, the river was 114 m (374 ft) above sea level and only 400 nmi (740 km; 460 mi) from the Pacific coast; Falke had travelled around 5,200 nmi (9,600 km; 6,000 mi) up the river; a shortage of coal prevented her from proceeding further. On 30 April, she arrived back at the mouth of the river.

On 8 May, Falke arrived in Port of Spain in Trinidad before being ordered to the coast of Venezuela to safeguard German interests during a period of unrest there. While en route, she stopped in Fort-de-France, Martinique to pick up a load of food and medical supplies for the people living around Mont Pelee, which had recently erupted. She then proceeded to La Guaira and Carúpano in Venezuela to protect German nationals from expected fighting, and from June evacuated German and French nationals from the two cities to Saint Thomas. She was based out of the port of Charlotte Amalie in the Virgin Islands. During this period, she made stops in Carúpano, La Guaira, and Puerto Cabello, along with a visit to Willemstad in Curaçao. On 30 September, she was sent to Port-au-Prince, Haiti, to protect German nationals there during a revolution in the country. At times, landing parties had to be sent ashore to protect the German consulate in Gonaïves.

By this time, the situation in Venezuela had worsened, necessitating foreign warships to remain of the coast to protect foreign nationals in the country. In December, Falke ran aground while leaving Willemstad; the training ship Stosch pulled her free only with great difficulty. The ship was nevertheless not damaged in the accident. On 16 December, the East American Cruiser Division was formally established by the German Navy, led by the flagship Vineta. Falke was thereafter occupied with operations during the Venezuela Crisis of 1902–1903. The Germans operated in concert with the British Royal Navy and the Italian Regia Marina; they sought to compel the Venezuelan government to make reparations for grievances related to internal conflicts in the over the previous decade. The crisis began when a British merchant ship was boarded and its crew arrested by Venezuelan forces on 13 December; in response, British forces bombarded the forts at Puerto Cabello, and enlisted the German squadron to assist them in punishing the Venezuelans. Falke and Gazelle were tasked with blockading the Venezuelan coast, in cooperation with the British squadron. Falke then moved to Maracaibo to enforce the blockade there along with the gunboat Panther. On 17 January 1903, the Germans chased a merchant schooner, which had evaded the blockade and entered Lake Maracaibo, but were blocked from entering the lake by Venezuelan coastal fortifications. In retaliation, Panther bombarded Fort San Carlos near Maracaibo.

Leaving the West Indies, on 28 February 1903 the Falke went to the Royal Naval Dockyard of the British North America and West Indies Station at Ireland Island in the British colony of Bermuda, where she stayed from 8 to 13 March. From October 1903 to November 1905, Paul Behncke served as the ship's commander. In January 1904, the ship visited New Orleans with the rest of the American Squadron, which at that time included Vineta, Gazelle, and Panther. She stopped in Newport News in the United States from 26 May to 16 June 1904. She then cruised south to visit several Brazilian ports, starting on 17 July. On 23 September, she stopped in Buenos Aires, and four weeks later, continued south around Cape Horn via the Strait of Magellan. She continued as far north as Peru by the end of 1904 and stopped in several Argentinian and Chilean ports along the way, including Valparaíso on 20 December. In the meantime, the East American Cruiser Division was disbanded. Starting on 6 January 1905, Falke resumed her voyage up the Pacific coast of the Americas, stopping in Peru, Colombia, and several Central American countries. On 15 June she reached San Francisco, where she stayed for three weeks. On 10 July she resumed her cruise northward and visited harbors in Canada and southern Alaska.

On the return voyage, she steamed up the Columbia River and toured the Gulf of California. She spent Christmas and New Year's Day in Mazatlán in Mexico and also stopped in Callao. While cruising off the coast of Chile in August, she was damaged by a severe storm. Repairs were effected in Talcahuano; while she was being repaired, an earthquake struck Valparaíso. Once she was ready for sea, Falke carried food and medical supplies to the city between 28 August and 2 September. The ship returned to Chile to be present during the inauguration ceremony for President Pedro Montt on 18 September. She then returned to Talcahuano to complete her repairs. On 4 September, she departed and steamed down to Punta Arenas, where she stayed from 2 to 15 December. Falke then crossed back to the Atlantic and steamed up to Montevideo in January 1907; there, she received the order to return to Germany.

Falke departed Montevideo and crossed the Atlantic to Dakar, proceeding to Las Palmas and then Lisbon. There she was visited by Frederick Augustus III of Saxony. She arrived in Danzig on 15 April, after five and a half years abroad. The ship was decommissioned on 20 January 1908, and an evaluation determined that she was not worth overhauling. She was accordingly stricken from the naval register on 25 October 1912 and broken up the following year at the Kaiserliche Werft in Danzig.
