= SMS Cormoran (1892) =

Unprotected cruiser of the German Imperial Navy

Coordinates: 36.0500°N 120.2667°E

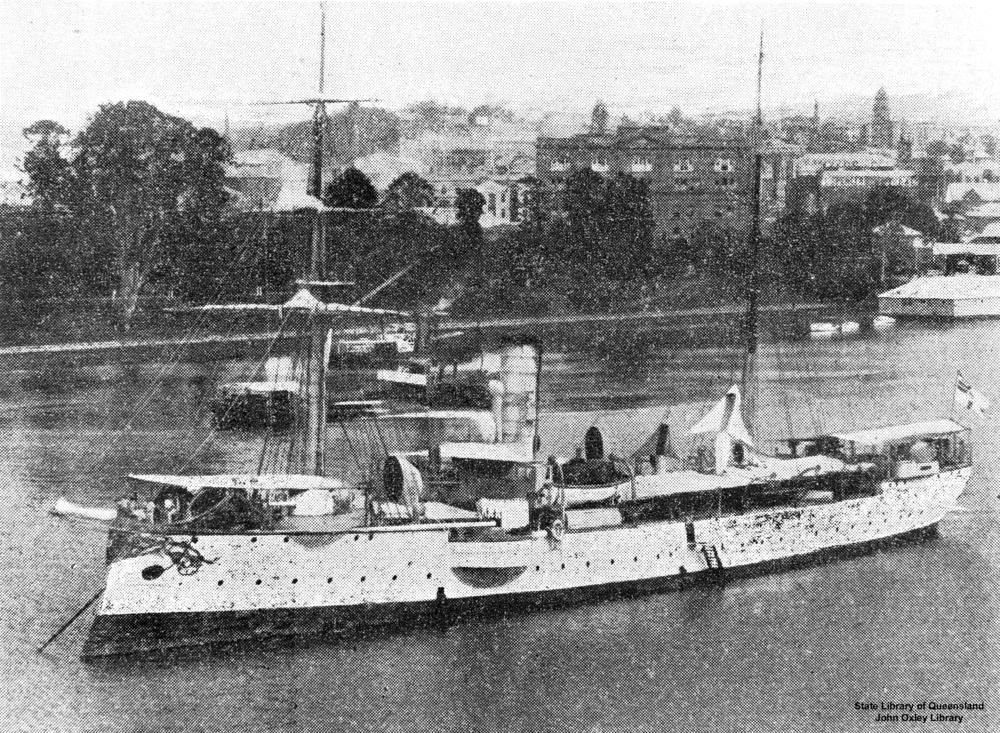
- Cormoran in Brisbane, Australia

History

German Empire
- Name: Cormoran
- Namesake: Great cormorant
- Laid down: 1890
- Launched: 17 May 1892
- Commissioned: 25 July 1893
- Fate: Scuttled at Tsingtau, 28 September 1914

General characteristics
- Class & type: Bussard-class cruiser
- Displacement: Normal: 1,612 t (1,587 long tons); Full load: 1,864 t (1,835 long tons)
- Length: 82.6 m (271 ft)
- Beam: 12.7 m (41 ft 8 in)
- Draft: 4.42 m (14 ft 6 in)
- Installed power: 4 × fire-tube boilers; 2,800 PS (2,800 ihp)
- Propulsion: 2 × triple-expansion steam engines; 2 × screw propellers
- Speed: 15.5 knots (28.7 km/h; 17.8 mph)
- Range: 2,950 nmi (5,460 km) at 9 knots (17 km/h)
- Complement: 9 officers; 152 enlisted men
- Armament: 8 × 10.5 cm (4.1 in) SK L/35 guns; 5 × 3.7 cm (1.5 in) Hotchkiss revolver cannon; 2 × 35 cm (13.8 in) torpedo tubes

SMS Cormoran ("His Majesty's Ship Cormorant") (Note: "SMS" stands for "Seiner Majestät Schiff" (German: His Majesty's Ship).) was an unprotected cruiser of the Bussard class, the fifth member of a class of six ships. She was built for the Imperial German Navy for overseas duty. The cruiser's keel was laid down in Danzig in 1890; she was launched in May 1892 and commissioned in July 1893. Cormoran was armed with a main battery of eight 10.5-centimeter (4.1 in) guns, and could steam at a speed of 15.5 knots (28.7 km/h; 17.8 mph).

Cormoran spent the majority of her career abroad, usually in Germany's South Pacific colonies in the Samoan Islands. Her duties there typically consisted of survey work and suppressing colonial unrest. She briefly cruised in South African waters in late 1894 and early 1895 before steaming to the Pacific. She participated in the seizure of the Jiaozhou Bay Leased Territory in the Shandong Peninsula in China in 1897. Cormoran returned to Germany in 1903 and was modernized in 1907–08. The following year, she returned to the South Pacific, where she remained until the outbreak of World War I in August 1914. Docked in Tsingtau for repairs at the onset of hostilities, she was unable to actively take part in the fighting. She was therefore disarmed and scuttled in the harbor; her guns were used to strengthen the defenses of the port.

== Description ==
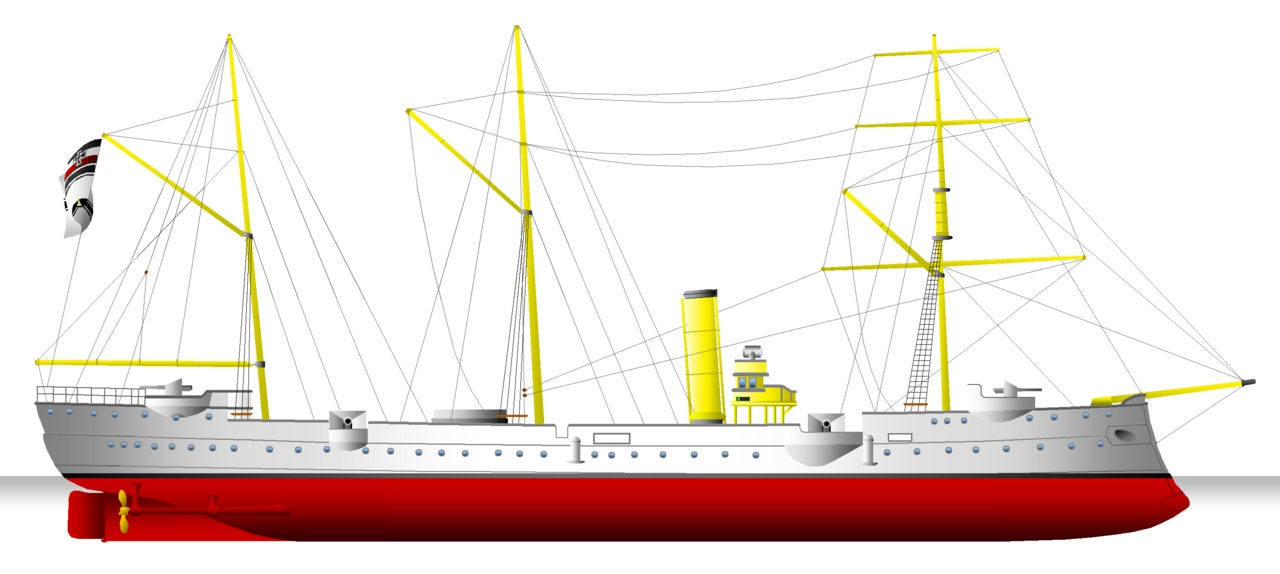
Illustration of the Bussard-class cruiser Geier

Through the 1870s and early 1880s, Germany built two types of cruising vessels: small, fast avisos suitable for service as fleet scouts and larger, long-ranged screw corvettes capable of patrolling the German colonial empire. A pair of new cruisers was authorized under the 1886–1887 fiscal year, intended for the latter purpose. General Leo von Caprivi, the Chief of the Imperial Admiralty, sought to modernize Germany's cruiser force. The first step in the program, the two Schwalbe-class unprotected cruisers, provided the basis for the larger Bussard class.

Cormoran was 82.6 meters (271 ft) long overall and had a beam of 12.7 m (42 ft) and a draft of 4.42 m (14.5 ft) forward. She displaced 1,612 t (1,587 long tons) normally and up to 1,864 t (1,835 long tons; 2,055 short tons) at full load. Her propulsion system consisted of two horizontal 3-cylinder triple-expansion steam engines that drove a pair of screw propellers. Steam was provided by four coal-fired cylindrical fire-tube boilers that were ducted into a single funnel. These provided a top speed of 15.5 knots (28.7 km/h; 17.8 mph) from 2,800 metric horsepower (2,800 ihp), and a range of approximately 2,950 nautical miles (5,460 km; 3,390 mi) at 9 kn (17 km/h; 10 mph). She had a crew of 9 officers and 152 enlisted men.

The ship was armed with a main battery of eight 10.5 cm (4.1 in) SK L/35 quick-firing (QF) guns in single pedestal mounts, supplied with 800 rounds of ammunition in total. They had a range of 10,800 m (35,400 ft). Two guns were placed side by side forward, two on each broadside, and two side by side aft. The gun armament was rounded out by five 3.7 cm (1.5 in) Hotchkiss revolver cannon for defense against torpedo boats. She was also equipped with two 35 cm (13.8 in) torpedo tubes with five torpedoes, both of which were mounted on the deck.

== Service history ==
Cormoran was built by the Kaiserliche Werft (Imperial Shipyard) in Danzig, ordered under the contract name "F". (Note: German warships were ordered under provisional names. Additions to the fleet were given a single letter; ships intended to replace older or lost vessels were ordered as "Ersatz (name of the ship to be replaced)".) Her keel was laid in 1890 and her completed hull was launched on 17 May 1892. Kaiser Wilhelm II attended the launching ceremony with the senior director of the Kaiserliche Werft. Work was completed by 25 July 1893, when she was commissioned into the Imperial German Navy. Following her commissioning, she underwent two months of sea trials, which were completed on 22 September. Starting in 1894, Cormoran was assigned to overseas service in Germany's colonial possessions. She was initially ordered on 2 October to the East Asia Station to replace the gunboat SMS Wolf, but the rising tensions in South Africa led the Navy to send the new cruiser to German East Africa to secure German interests in the region instead.

On 16 October, Cormoran and her newly commissioned sister ship Condor left Germany, bound for East Africa. They arrived in Lourenço Marques, the capital of Portuguese Mozambique, on 15 December. Cormoran remained there for the next seven months. In January 1895, she towed the Portuguese cruiser Afonso de Albuquerque back to Lourenço Marques. In July, Condor arrived there to replace Cormoran; the latter was now free to return to her original deployment to East Asian waters. She left East Africa on 5 July. While en route, she stopped in Muscat, Oman, where she paid an official visit to the sultan. On 5 August while steaming in the Strait of Hormuz, the safety valve on the starboard low-pressure cylinder of the starboard engine was damaged. As a result, Cormoran had to put into Bushehr, Persia, for repairs. Following completion of the repair work, Cormoran cruised to Basra via the Shatt al-Arab, where she paid visits to the local German consul and Turkish authorities.

=== First deployment to the Pacific ===
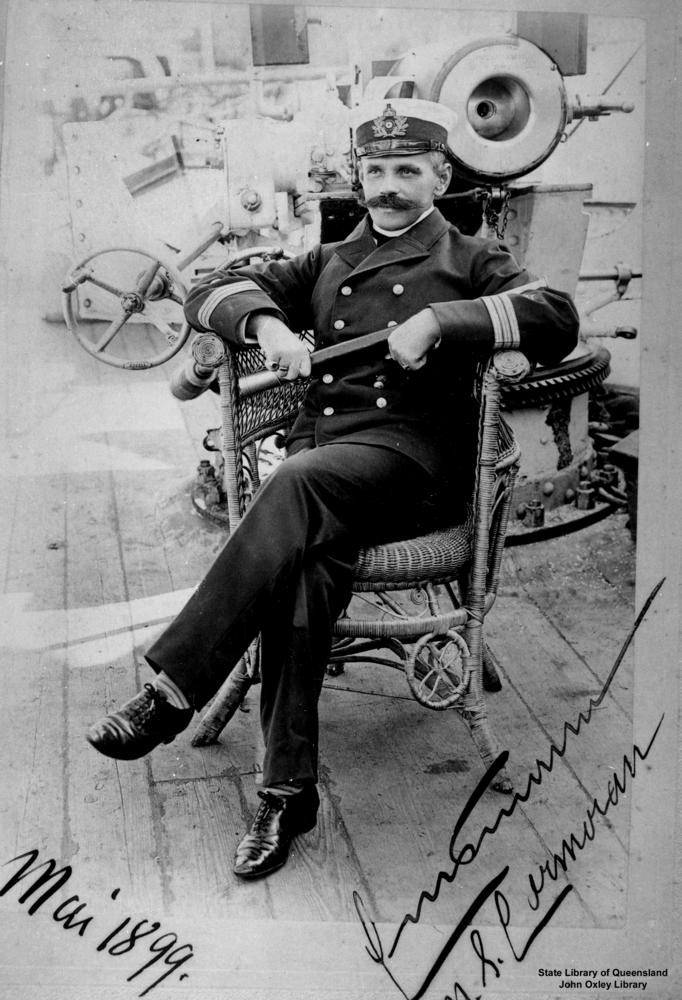
Korvettenkapitän Hugo Emsmann, Cormoran's commander, aboard the ship in May 1899

On 13 September 1895, Cormoran arrived in Singapore and joined the East Asia Division under the command of Rear Admiral Hoffmann, who flew his flag in the armored cruiser SMS Kaiser. In July 1896, she participated in the recovery of the stranded gunboat Iltis. In October and November 1897, Cormoran steamed up the Yangtze River to Hankow. She was also involved in the occupation of the Jiaozhou Bay Leased Territory. She went to the Philippines during the Spanish–American War in May 1898; the American cruiser USS Raleigh prevented Cormoran from entering Cavite. In November, she towed Kaiser from Samsah Bay in Fujian to Hong Kong for repairs. The tense political situation in German Samoa prompted the Admiralstab (Admiralty Staff) to send Cormoran to reinforce her sisters Bussard and Falke there.

While en route to Samoa on the night of 23–24 March 1899, Cormoran ran aground on the Whirlwind Reef, north of the western tip of New Pomerania. She was stuck on the reef amidships, so that her bow was sticking about a meter out of the water. The crew attempted to lighten the ship by removing coal and ammunition, but she remained grounded on the reef. The ship's commander, Korvettenkapitän Hugo Emsmann, sent the steam pinnace and a dinghy with two officers and eleven men, towing a load of coal, to Friedrich-Wilhelmshafen, some 162 nautical miles (300 km; 186 mi) away. There, they met the steamer Stettin, which arrived on the scene on 29 March. Emsmann then decided to remove all unnecessary coal and ammunition—some of which was put ashore and the rest simply thrown overboard—to cut away the fore and mainmast, and to move the stern guns forward. These measures allowed the ship to float free from the reef. The crew then re-stowed the supplies that had been sent ashore before returning to Friedrich-Wilhelmshafen. There, her seaworthiness was inspected, and additional supplies were brought aboard. Cormoran then steamed to Sydney for dry-docking; a full inspection of her hull revealed that it had only been slightly damaged. Repairs lasted until early June.

Cormoran returned to Sydney in mid-June 1900 for her annual overhaul. Part of her crew was replaced; these men were then sent to China to take part in the suppression of the Boxer Uprising. On 2 October, Cormoran anchored in Apia, before embarking on a tour of the German Pacific colonies. Another overhaul in Sydney followed, which lasted from 15 March to 1 May 1901. During this period, she and the protected cruiser Hansa represented Germany during the first Parliament of Australia in Melbourne. While on the return journey to Samoa, Cormoran was sent to the St Matthias Islands in the Bismarck Archipelago, where a German researcher named Mencke had been murdered, along with his assistant. There, Cormoran and the survey vessel Möwe attacked the islanders responsible for the murders. On 28 July, Cormoran had returned to Apia, and through November, the ship was occupied with survey work and trips to the other islands.

In 1902, she again visited the Bismarck Archipelago and the Marshall Islands. Further repairs were effected in Sydney, and the cruiser was back in Apia by 18 August. Another tour of Germany's colonies began on 23 September. She returned to Sydney for periodic maintenance in mid-March 1903, and there she received the order to return to Germany. Cormoran departed Sydney on 23 May, bound for Germany; she reached Kiel on 13 September. While in Germany, she served a stint in the main fleet. The ship was modernized during a lengthy reconstruction that started in 1907 at the Kaiserliche Werft in Danzig. New boilers manufactured by J W Klawitter in Danzig were installed, and her sailing rig was reduced. A new, larger conning tower was also installed. Work was completed in 1908, and on 1 May 1909, Cormoran was recommissioned for service in the Pacific.

=== Second deployment to the Pacific ===
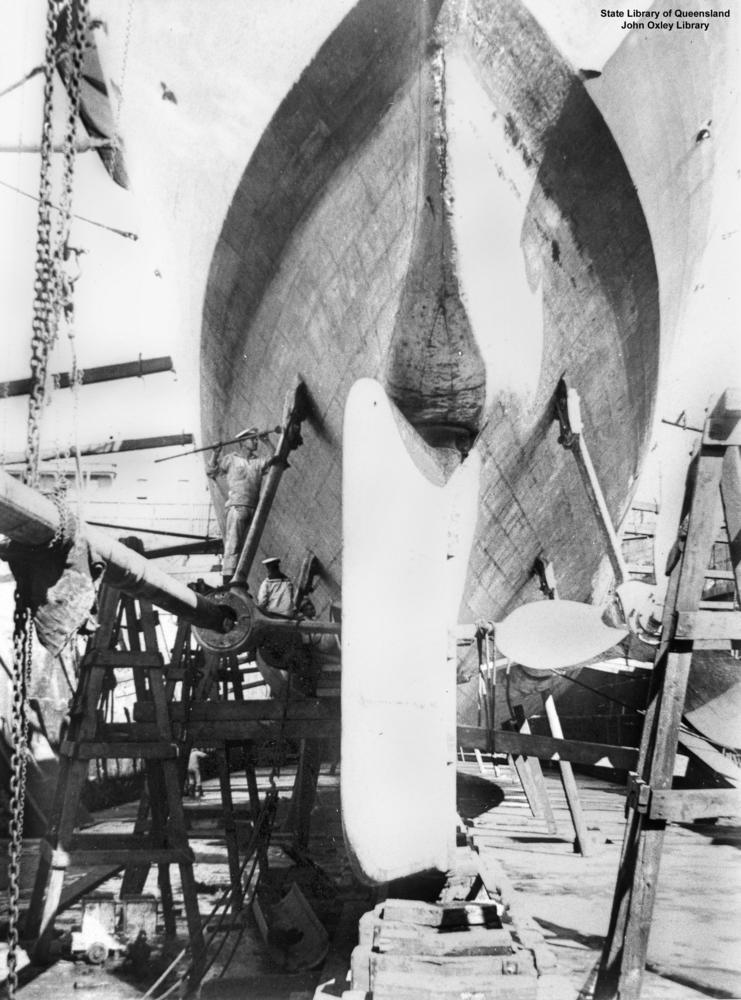
Cormoran in drydock in Sydney

While in Malta on 8 June 1909, she received orders to proceed to Asia Minor, where unrest in Turkey and violence against Armenians was prompting German intervention. She joined the cruisers Stettin and Lübeck, and took on some 300 Armenians to protect them from harassment. On 9 July, while moored in Port Said, she received the order to resume her voyage to the Pacific. Cormoran was forced to stop in Jeddah for repairs to her boilers. After reaching the Pacific, she began coastal survey work, and her landing party led a punitive expedition against cannibals in Kaiser-Wilhelmsland. On 3 November, she took part in a flag raising ceremony in Blanche Bay commemorating the German possession of New Pomerania. Three days later, her crew participated in the groundbreaking ceremony for a Bismarck tower in Toma, a town southwest of the capital, Herbertshöhe.

On 13 November, Cormoran embarked the governor in Herbertshöhe, and went first to Friedrich-Wilhelmshafen, then to Hansa-Hafen, and then to the Kaiserin-Augusta River. The cruiser steamed 183 nautical miles (339 km; 211 mi) up the river before being ordered to reverse course. By 22 November, she had reached the mouth of the river, and by 8 January 1910, she had moored in Apia once again. She participated in the celebrations for the tenth anniversary of the German annexation of the islands, which lasted from 28 February to 3 March. While on a trip to Hong Kong, she was caught in a hurricane, which did significant damage to the cruiser. Her sides were slightly pushed in and all of her boats were damaged by the storm. Temporary repairs were effected in Nouméa in New Caledonia. Cormoran finally arrived in Hong Kong on 3 May; by 15 July, she had returned to Apia. She was thereafter joined by her sister Condor, the armored cruiser Scharnhorst and the light cruisers Emden and Nürnberg from the East Asia Squadron. The five ships cruised together until, on 13 December while in Rabaul, they were ordered to proceed to Ponape to suppress the Sokehs Rebellion. They arrived on 19 December and operated in the area until 22 February, with Cormoran, Emden and Nürnberg landing shore parties in support of Polizei-Soldaten (a force of police officers) deployed from German New Guinea.

On 23 March, Cormoran' returned to Sydney for yet another annual overhaul. Afterward, she resumed her typical cruising duties in the German Pacific colonies. In September, she and the steamer Planet pulled free the Norwegian barque Fram, which had run aground. She received another major overhaul in Tsingtau in May 1912, which was followed by surveying cruises in the German colonies. She did not return to Apia until 10 January 1913. Cormoran was reclassified as a gunboat on 24 February 1913 by order of Admiral Alfred von Tirpitz, the State Secretary of the Reichsmarineamt (Imperial Navy Office). From 4 June to 5 July, she underwent repairs in Sydney. She was then obliged to stop in Bougainville due to tribal feuds on the island. She landed her shore party to assist the Polizeitruppen in suppressing the conflict. She departed for Tsingtau for further repair work in early 1914, arriving on 30 May.

As the political situation in Europe worsened in July 1914, the senior officer in Tsingtau at the time, Fregattenkapitän (Frigate Captain) Karl von Müller, the commander of Emden, ordered the repair work to Cormoran to be accelerated. After the outbreak of war in early August, Emden captured the Russian steamer Ryazan and brought her back to Tsingtau. Since Cormoran was still out of service, she was decommissioned and her crew was used to man Ryazan, which was commissioned as the auxiliary cruiser Cormoran. Men from the gunboats Iltis and Vaterland, along with some war volunteers, joined them aboard the new auxiliary cruiser. Much of her weaponry was removed to strengthen the shore defenses at Tsingtau on 6 August 1914 to protect the concession from British attack. She was scuttled in the harbor on the night of 28–29 September 1914 by the staff of the Imperial Dockyard to prevent her from being captured.
