= SMS Condor =

Unprotected cruiser of the German Imperial Navy

- Condor, probably in 1892 before her commissioning

History

German Empire
- Name: Condor
- Namesake: Condor
- Laid down: 1891
- Launched: 23 February 1892
- Commissioned: 9 December 1892
- Fate: Scrapped, 1921

General characteristics
- Class & type: Bussard-class cruiser
- Displacement: Normal: 1,612 t (1,587 long tons); Full load: 1,864 t (1,835 long tons)
- Length: 82.6 m (271 ft)
- Beam: 12.7 m (41 ft 8 in)
- Draft: 4.45 m (14 ft 7 in)
- Installed power: 4 × fire-tube boilers; 2,800 PS (2,800 ihp)
- Propulsion: 2 × triple-expansion steam engines; 2 × screw propellers
- Speed: 15.5 knots (28.7 km/h; 17.8 mph)
- Range: 2,990 nmi (5,540 km) at 9 knots (17 km/h)
- Complement: 9 officers; 152 enlisted men
- Armament: 8 × 10.5 cm (4.1 in) SK L/35 guns; 5 × 3.7 cm (1.5 in) Hotchkiss revolver cannon; 2 × 35 cm (13.8 in) torpedo tubes

SMS Condor (His Majesty's Ship Condor) (Note: "SMS" stands for "Seiner Majestät Schiff" (German: His Majesty's Ship).) was an unprotected cruiser of the Imperial German Navy. She was the fourth member of the Bussard class, which included five other vessels. The cruiser's keel was laid down in Hamburg in 1891, she was launched in February 1892, and was commissioned in December of that year. Intended for overseas duty, Condor was armed with a main battery of eight 10.5-centimeter (4.1 in) guns, and could steam at a speed of 15.5 knots (28.7 km/h; 17.8 mph).

Condor served abroad for the majority of her career, first in German East Africa in the 1890s, followed by a stint in the South Seas Station in the Pacific Ocean in the 1900s. She was present in East Africa amid rising tensions with Britain during the Second Boer War in 1899, and frequently suppressed uprisings in Germany's Pacific island holdings in the decade before the outbreak of World War I. Badly worn out, she returned to Germany in March 1914 and was removed from service. In 1916, she was converted into a storage hulk for mines. After the end of World War I, she was discarded and broken up for scrap in 1921.

== Design ==
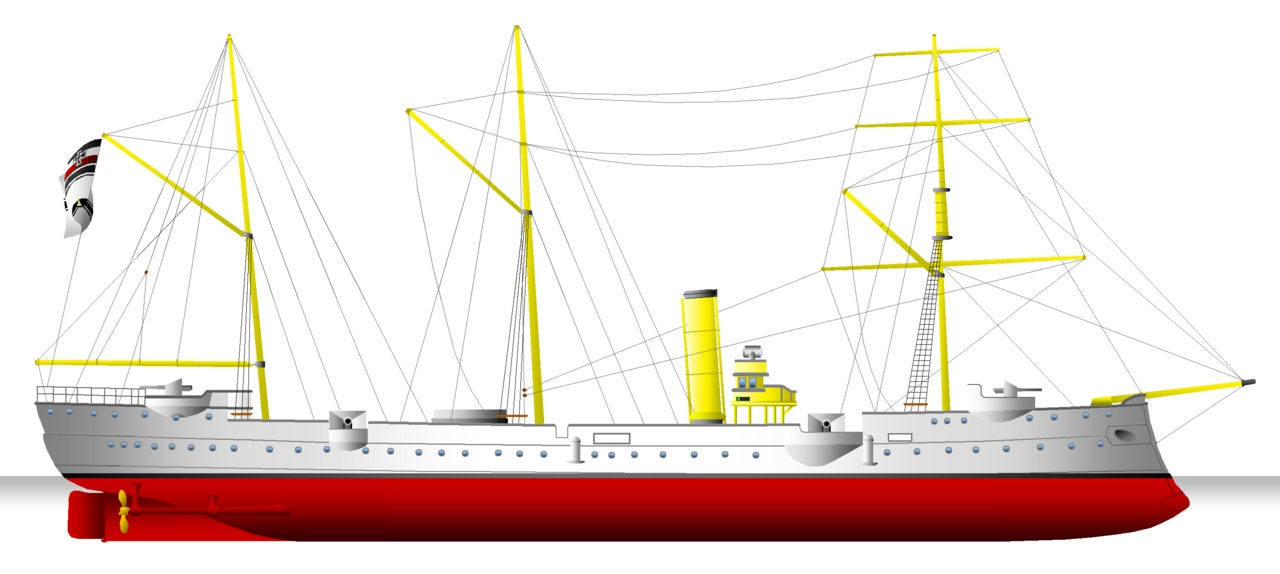
Illustration of her sister ship Geier

Through the 1870s and early 1880s, Germany built two types of cruising vessels: small, fast avisos suitable for service as fleet scouts and larger, long-ranged screw corvettes capable of patrolling the German colonial empire. A pair of new cruisers was authorized under the 1886–1887 fiscal year, intended for the latter purpose. General Leo von Caprivi, the Chief of the Imperial Admiralty, sought to modernize Germany's cruiser force. The first step in the program, the two Schwalbe-class unprotected cruisers, provided the basis for the larger Bussard class.

Condor was 83.9 meters (275 ft) long overall, with a beam of 12.7 m (42 ft) and a draft of 4.42 m (14.5 ft) forward. She displaced 1,612 t (1,587 long tons) normally and up to 1,864 t (1,835 long tons; 2,055 short tons) at full load. Her propulsion system consisted of two horizontal 3-cylinder triple-expansion steam engines that drove a pair of screw propellers. Steam was provided by four coal-fired cylindrical fire-tube boilers that were ducted into a single funnel. These provided a top speed of 15.5 knots (28.7 km/h; 17.8 mph) from 2,800 metric horsepower (2,800 ihp), and a range of approximately 2,950 nautical miles (5,460 km; 3,390 mi) at 9 kn (17 km/h; 10 mph). She had a crew of 9 officers and 152 enlisted men.

The ship was armed with a main battery of eight 10.5 cm (4.1 in) SK L/35 quick-firing (QF) guns in single pedestal mounts, supplied with 800 rounds of ammunition in total. They had a range of 10,800 m (35,400 ft). Two guns were placed side by side forward, two on each broadside, and two side by side aft. The gun armament was rounded out by five 3.7 cm (1.5 in) Hotchkiss revolver cannon for defense against torpedo boats. She was also equipped with two 35 cm (13.8 in) torpedo tubes with five torpedoes, both of which were mounted on the deck.

== Service history ==
Condor was ordered as a replacement for the gunboat SMS Eber, which had been sunk by the hurricane that hit Apia in 1889. She was laid down at the Blohm & Voss shipyard in Hamburg in 1891 under the contract name "Ersatz Eber". (Note: German warships were ordered under provisional names. Additions to the fleet were given a single letter; ships intended to replace older or lost vessels were ordered as "Ersatz (name of the ship to be replaced)".) An outbreak of Cholera in Hamburg made work on the ship difficult, but the completed hull was nevertheless ready for launching as scheduled, on 23 February 1892. Vizeadmiral (Vice Admiral) Wilhelm Schröder, the Chief of the Baltic Station, gave the speech at her launching, and she was christened by Kapitän zur See (Captain at Sea) von Bodenhausen, the director of the Kaiserliche Werft (Imperial Dockyard) in Wilhelmshaven. The ship accidentally launched itself due to the tide coming earlier than expected. She was completed on 9 December of that year, when she was commissioned into the Imperial German Navy; precautions against cholera delayed the beginning of sea trials until 15 December.

=== East Africa Station ===
On 2 October 1894, Condor was deployed to German East Africa, based in Dar es Salaam to replace the gunboat Möwe. One of the major reasons Condor was sent to the East African Station was the pressure Britain was placing on the Boer republics—the Transvaal and the Orange Free State—which Germany held to be in its interest. While in East Africa, Condor would have been able to rapidly respond to British actions in the region. And so while stationed here, Condor frequently moved back and forth between German East Africa and the eastern coast of South Africa until 1899, when the Second Boer War broke out. From 15 December 1894 to 1 January 1895, Condor was anchored in Lourenço Marques, the capital of Portuguese Mozambique. On 27 June, she joined her sister Cormoran in Delagoa Bay. Despite the tensions between Germany and Britain, Condor went to Durban for her annual overhaul, which lasted from 3 August to 16 November. She thereafter returned to German East Africa and replaced her sister Seeadler there.

In late December 1895, the British launched the so-called Jameson Raid into the Transvaal; this prompted the German Navy to send Condor back to Lourenço Marques in January 1896. From 14 to 16 June, she was sent to Mahé in the Seychelles to rest her crew. She was called back early to return to East Africa. From 26 August to 25 November, she lay off Cape Town, but protests against the German consul, Count von Pfeil, led to moving the cruiser back to Lourenço Marques, where she remained from 11 December to 2 February 1897. A delegation from the cruiser was sent to the opening ceremonies for the Pretoria–Lourenço Marques rail line, which had been built with German funding. During this period, she served with the cruiser Schwalbe. On 3 January 1901, Condor departed Africa, bound for Germany. While en route in the North Sea, she responded to the distress signal from the German steamer Mawska.

=== South-Seas Station ===
While in Germany, she underwent repairs to her hull and propulsion system. Two years later, she was sent to the Pacific to replace Cormoran on the South-Seas Station. On 26 June 1903, she arrived in Singapore. In 1904, Condor served with her sister Seeadler and the old gunboat Möwe, which had by that time been converted to a survey ship. Condor helped suppress minor unrest in German Samoa between July and September 1904. In April–May 1905, she went to Sydney, Australia for basic repairs. She thereafter carried the Imperial governor of German Samoa, Wilhelm Solf, on a visit to Hawaii; the trip lasted from 30 August to 14 September. Annual overhauls in Sydney took place during the periods 9 March – 16 May 1907 and 10 March – 18 May 1908. In October 1907, Condor was sent to the southern Ralik Chain to conduct gunnery training. The gunfire was intended as a show of force to prevent the local tribal chief from rebelling against the German authorities.

In concert with the gunboat Jaguar, Condor participated in the suppression of unrest in the Marshall Islands in September and October 1908. During this operation, she carried a contingent of Melanesian infantry to the island of Pohnpei to suppress tensions between rival factions on the island. In early 1909, unrest broke out in Apia; because Condor was absent, the light cruisers Leipzig and Arcona and Jaguar were sent to suppress the uprising. In August, Condor searched unsuccessfully for the lost government steamer Seestern', which had been sailing to Brisbane. Condor met the armored cruiser Scharnhorst and the light cruisers Nürnberg and Emden from the East Asia Squadron in Apia in July 1910. In January 1911, she went to Pohnpei again to suppress the Sokehs Rebellion, along with Leipzig and Cormoran.

From 20 May 1911 to 1 October 1911, she underwent basic repairs at the Kaiserliche Werft at Tsingtau. During the Agadir Crisis in November, she went to Yap in order to be able to quickly receive news from the recently constructed wireless station there. Further maintenance was effected at Sydney from 1 March to 18 April 1912. That year, her survey staff was enlarged to allow for greater coastal survey work in the German protectorates. On 8 January 1913, Condor was reclassified as a gunboat. During basic repairs in Tsingtao in May, her hull was found to be in very bad condition. The order to return to Germany came while she was stationed in Apia in November. While en route, she had to protect the German steamer Zanzibar from hostile Moroccans, which had run aground off the Moroccan coast.

=== Fate ===
Condor arrived in Danzig on 30 March 1914, where she was placed out of service. Starting in 1916, she was reduced to a hulk for storing naval mines off Friedrichsort in Kiel. She served in this capacity throughout World War I, and she was discarded in the post-war reduction in the strength of the German navy. She was stricken on 18 November 1920 and sold for scrapping on 8 April 1921. She was broken up that year in Hamburg.
