= SS Stettin =

Stettin was the name of a number of steamships.

- SS Stettin (1886), a German cargo ship
- SS Stettin (1923), a German cargo ship
- SS Stettin (1925), a German cargo ship
- SS Stettin (1933), a German icebreaker
