= Bussard-class cruiser =

Unprotected cruiser class of the German Imperial Navy

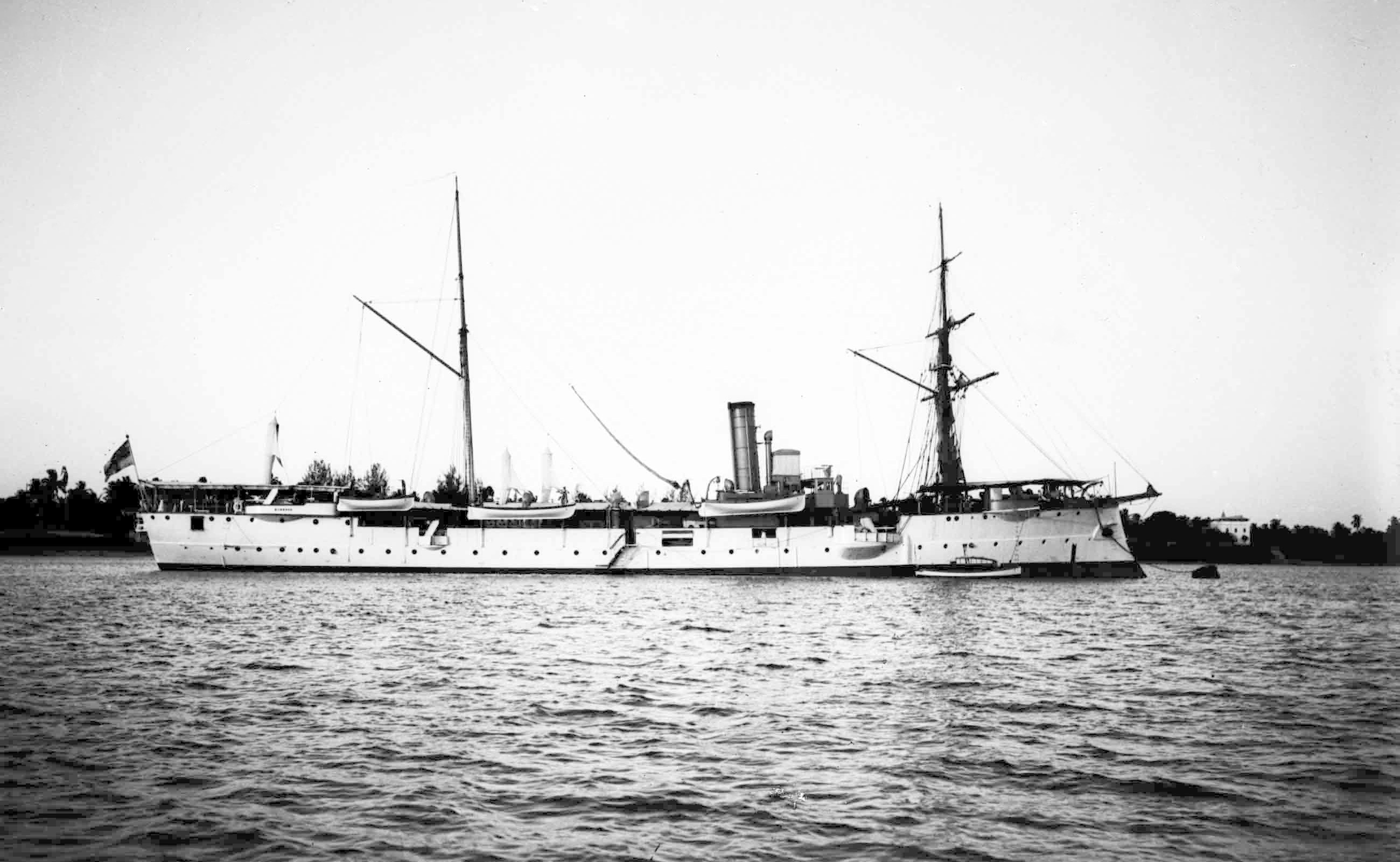
- SMS Bussard in Dar es Salaam

Class overview
- Builders: Kaiserliche Werft Danzig (3); Blohm and Voss (1); Kaiserliche Werft Kiel (1); Kaiserliche Werft Wilhelmshaven (1)
- Preceded by: Schwalbe class
- Succeeded by: SMS Gefion
- Built: 1888–1895
- Completed: 6
- Lost: 3
- Scrapped: 3

General characteristics
- Type: Unprotected cruiser
- Displacement: Normal: 1,559 t (1,534 long tons); Full load: 1,868 t (1,838 long tons)
- Length: 82.60 m (271 ft)
- Beam: 12.50 m (41 ft)
- Draft: 4.45 m (14 ft 7 in)
- Installed power: 4 × fire-tube boilers; 2,800 PS (2,800 ihp)
- Propulsion: 2 × triple-expansion steam engines; 2 × screw propellers
- Speed: 15.5 knots (28.7 km/h; 17.8 mph)
- Range: 2,990 nmi (5,540 km) at 9 knots (17 km/h; 10 mph)
- Complement: 9 officers; 152 enlisted men
- Armament: 8 × 10.5 cm (4.1 in) SK L/35 guns; 5 × 3.7 cm (1.5 in) Hotchkiss revolver cannon; 2 × 35 cm (13.8 in) torpedo tubes

The Bussard class of unprotected cruisers were built for the German Kaiserliche Marine (Imperial Navy) in the late 1880s and early 1890s. The class comprised six ships: Bussard, the lead ship, Falke, Seeadler, Cormoran, Condor, and Geier. Designed for service in Germany's colonial empire, the class emphasized a long-range cruising radius and relatively heavy armament; they were also the last cruisers in the Kaiserliche Marine to be equipped with an auxiliary sailing rig. The ships were equipped with eight 10.5-centimeter (4.1 in) guns.

All six ships served abroad for the majority of their careers, primarily in Africa and the south Pacific, where they assisted in the suppression of uprisings such as the Boxer Rebellion in China and the Sokehs Rebellion in the Caroline Islands. Cormoran participated in the seizure of the Jiaozhou Bay Leased Territory in China in 1897, and Falke was involved in the Venezuela Crisis of 1902–03. Bussard and Falke were broken up for scrap in 1912, but the remaining four ships were still in service following the outbreak of World War I in August 1914.

Cormoran was based in Qingdao with unusable engines; she was scuttled in the harbor since she was no longer operational. Geier briefly operated against British shipping in the Pacific before having to put into Hawaii for internment by the then-neutral United States. After the United States entered the war in April 1917, she was seized and commissioned into the US Navy as USS Schurz; she served as an escort until she was accidentally sunk following a collision with a freighter in June 1918. Seeadler and Condor, meanwhile, had been converted into mine storage hulks after the start of the war. Seeadler was destroyed by an accidental explosion in 1917. Condor was the only member of the class to survive the war, and she was scrapped in 1921.

== Design ==
Through the 1870s and early 1880s, Germany built two types of cruising vessels: small, fast avisos suitable for service as fleet scouts and larger, long-ranged screw corvettes capable of patrolling the German colonial empire. A pair of new cruisers was authorized under the 1886–1887 fiscal year, intended for the latter purpose. General Leo von Caprivi, the Chief of the Imperial Admiralty, sought to modernize Germany's cruiser force. The first step in the program, the two Schwalbe-class unprotected cruisers, provided the basis for the larger Bussard class.

The Bussard class was designed for service abroad and the design for the Bussard class was prepared in 1888. The ships were significantly larger and faster than the Schwalbe class, but mounted the same battery of guns—though only Bussard carried the same type of guns—the rest carried a newer, quick-firing model. They were also the last cruiser class in the German Kaiserliche Marine (Imperial Navy) to be equipped with a sailing rig; the subsequent unprotected cruiser Gefion was entirely steam-powered.

=== General characteristics ===
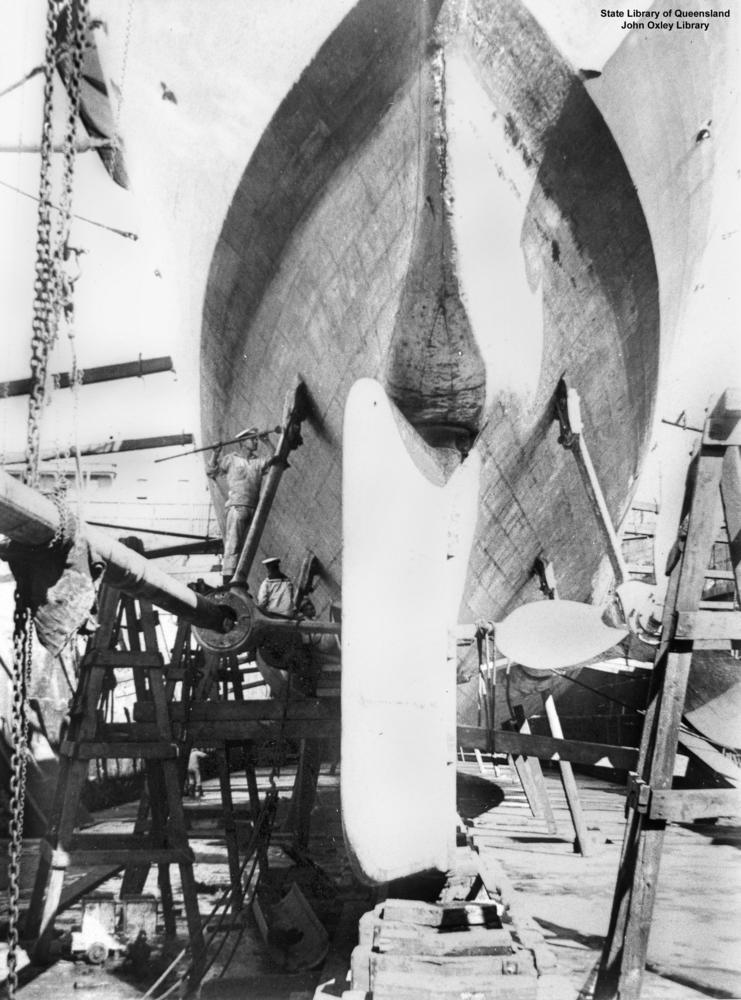
Cormoran in drydock in Sydney showing the arrangement of the screws and rudder

The ships of the Bussard class all differed slightly in their characteristics. The first two ships, Bussard and Falke, were 79.62 meters (261 ft 3 in) long at the waterline and 82.60 m (271 ft) long overall. They had a beam of 12.50 m (41 ft) and a draft of 4.45 m (14 ft 7 in) forward and 5.63 m (18 ft 6 in) aft. They displaced 1,559 metric tons (1,534 long tons) as designed and up to 1,868 t (1,838 long tons) at full load. The next three ships, Seeadler, Condor, and Cormoran, were 79.62 m (261 ft 3 in) long at the waterline and had the same overall length as their earlier sister ships. They had a beam of 12.70 m (41 ft 8 in) and a draft of 4.42 m (14 ft 6 in) forward and 5.35 m (17 ft 7 in) aft. They displaced 1,612 t (1,587 long tons) as designed and 1,864 t (1,835 long tons) at full load. The last ship, Geier, was 79.62 m long at the waterline and 83.90 m (275 ft 3 in) long overall. She had a beam of 10.60 m (34 ft 9 in) and a draft of 4.74 m (15 ft 7 in) forward and 5.22 m (17 ft 2 in) aft.

The cruisers' hulls were constructed with transverse steel frames with yellow pine planking up to the upper deck. A layer of Muntz metal sheathing covered the hull to protect the wood from shipworm. The stem and sternposts were constructed with steel and timber. A bronze naval ram was fitted at the bow. The hull was divided into ten watertight compartments, and a double bottom was installed below the boiler rooms. The ships were good sea boats, but they rolled badly and the sponsons for the main guns caused severe vibration. Since Geier was laid down after the other five ships entered service, she was redesigned slightly to discard the sponsons, and so she did not suffer from bad vibration. They were very maneuverable, except for turns into the wind when steaming at low speed. The ships had a crew of 9 officers and 152 enlisted men. They carried a number of smaller boats, including one picket boat, one cutter, two yawls, and two dinghies.

=== Propulsion ===
Their propulsion system consisted of two horizontal 3-cylinder triple-expansion steam engines powered by four coal-fired cylindrical fire-tube boilers; the engines were rated at 2,800 metric horsepower (2,800 ihp) and were placed in their own engine rooms. The engines drove a pair of 3-bladed screw propellers that were 3 m (9 ft 10 in) wide in diameter. The boilers were divided into two boiler rooms and were trunked into a single funnel. The ships were fitted with an auxiliary schooner barque rig with a total surface area of 856 to 877 m^{2} (9,210 to 9,440 sq ft). Steering was controlled by a single rudder. Each ship was equipped with a pair of electricity generators with a combined output of 24 kilowatts (32 hp) at 67 volts.

The propulsion system provided a top speed of 15.5 kn (28.7 km/h; 17.8 mph), though all six ships exceeded their design speeds while on sea trials, reaching between 15.7 to 16.9 knots (29.1 to 31.3 km/h; 18.1 to 19.4 mph). The ships carried between 170 to 205 t (167 to 202 long tons; 187 to 226 short tons) of coal as designed, and they could accommodate up to 305 to 320 t (300 to 315 long tons; 336 to 353 short tons) of coal using additional storage spaces. This provided a range of between 2,990 to 3,610 nautical miles (5,540 to 6,690 km; 3,440 to 4,150 mi) at 9 knots (17 km/h; 10 mph).

=== Armament ===
The first ship was armed with a main battery of eight 10.5 cm K L/35 guns in single pedestal mounts, supplied with 800 rounds of ammunition in total. They had a range of 8,200 m (26,902 ft 11 in). The five subsequent ships were equipped with newer quick-firing SK L/35 versions of the 10.5 cm guns. These newer guns also had a longer range, of 10,800 m (35,433 ft 1 in). Two guns were placed side by side on the forecastle, two on each broadside—one in a sponson and the other in a gun port—and two side by side on the quarterdeck. Geier did not use sponsons for the second pair of guns, instead simply mounting them on the upper deck. The gun armament was rounded out by five 3.7 cm (1.5 in) Hotchkiss revolver cannon for defense against torpedo boats. The first five ships were also equipped with two 35 cm (13.8 in) torpedo tubes, both of which were mounted on the deck. Geier instead had larger 45 cm (17.7 in) torpedo tubes. Each ship carried five torpedoes.

== Ships ==
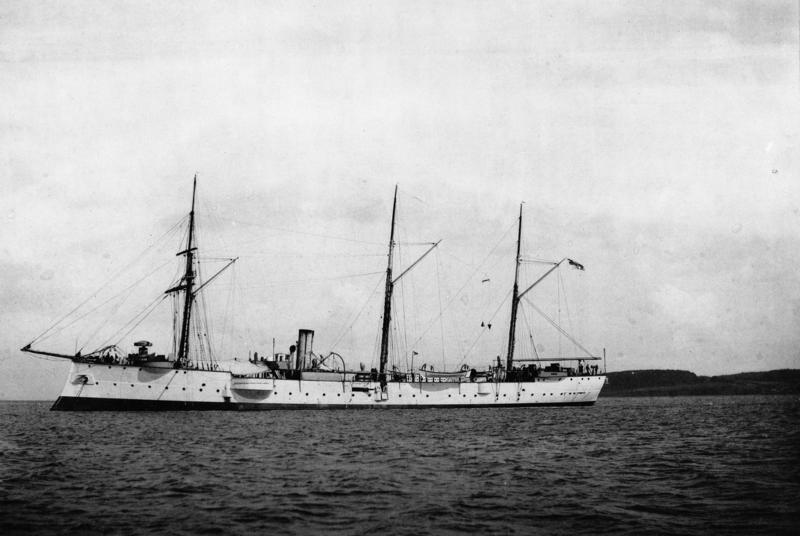
Falke in 1892

Construction data
Name	Builder	Laid down	Launched	Commissioned
Bussard	Kaiserliche Werft, Danzig	1888	23 January 1890	7 October 1890
Falke	Kaiserliche Werft, Kiel	1890	4 April 1891	14 September 1891
Seeadler	Kaiserliche Werft, Danzig	1890	2 February 1892	17 August 1892
Condor	Blohm & Voss, Hamburg	1891	23 February 1892	9 December 1892
Cormoran	Kaiserliche Werft, Danzig	1890	17 May 1892	25 July 1893
Geier	Kaiserliche Werft, Wilhelmshaven	1893	18 October 1894	24 October 1895

== Service history ==
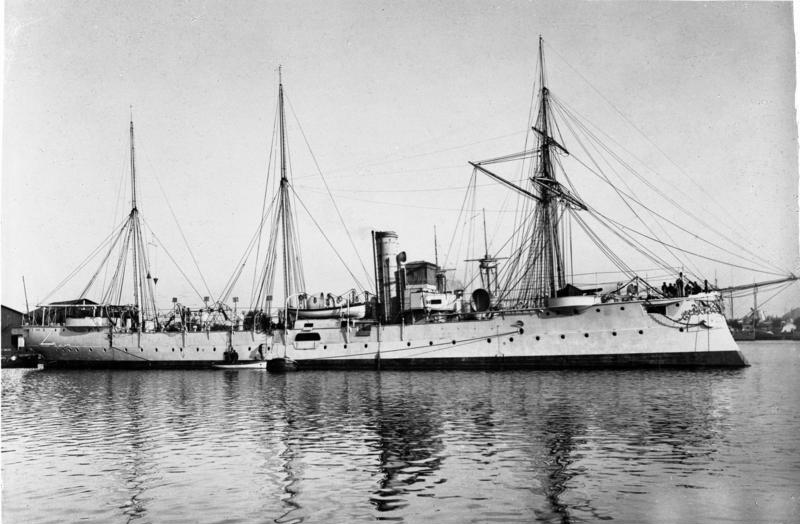
Geier in 1894

All six ships of the class spent the majority of their careers abroad, primarily in Germany's colonial possessions in Africa and the Pacific. Seeadler visited the United States in March 1893, along with the protected cruiser Kaiserin Augusta, for the belated celebrations for the 400th anniversary of Columbus's crossing of the Atlantic. In July of that year, while assigned to the East Asia Division, Bussard and Falke assisted in the suppression of Mata'afa Iosefo's revolt in Samoa, along with a British corvette. Throughout the 1890s, Seeadler was assigned to Germany's colonies in East Africa and Southwest Africa, where she suppressed local uprisings.

In November 1897, Cormoran took part in the seizure of the Jiaozhou Bay Leased Territory in the Shandong Peninsula in Qing China. Geier was present in the Caribbean during the Spanish–American War in 1898, though she took no active role in the conflict. Between 1898 and 1900, Bussard and Seeadler were modernized in Germany. In 1900, Seeadler participated in the suppression of the Boxer Rebellion in China, including a blockade of the Chinese coast. In December 1902, Falke and the protected cruiser Vineta joined British forces in the Venezuela Crisis of 1902–03 after Venezuelan forces seized a British merchant ship. The two cruisers helped British warships bombard Venezuelan coastal fortifications and blockade the coast.

Cormoran and Geier were modernized between 1907 and 1909; only Falke and Condor never returned for major dockyard work. Condor and Cormoran suppressed the Sokehs Rebellion in the Caroline Islands in January 1911, along with the light cruiser Leipzig. In 1912, when the Second Balkan War broke out, Geier was stationed in the eastern Mediterranean Sea to observe the hostilities. Both Bussard and Falke were stricken from the naval register on 25 October 1912 and broken up the following year, at Hamburg and the Kaiserliche Werft in Danzig, respectively.

After the outbreak of World War I in August 1914, Seeadler was converted into a mine storage hulk in Wilhelmshaven. An accidental explosion in April 1917 destroyed the ship, and her wreck was never raised. Condor was used for the same purpose in Kiel; she survived the war and was broken up for scrap in 1921 in Hamburg. Cormoran, still stationed in Qingdao, was scuttled in the harbor because her engines were in poor condition. Geier meanwhile operated against British merchant shipping in the Pacific following the onset of hostilities. By October, she was running low on coal and had been isolated from any sources of support; she therefore steamed to Hawaii, where she was interned by the US Navy. After the United States declared war on Germany on 6 April 1917, she was seized and commissioned as USS Schurz for use as an escort vessel. She was sunk after colliding with a merchant ship in June 1918.
