= SS Stettin (1886) =

History

German Empire
- Name: SS Stettin
- Operator: Norddeutscher Lloyd
- Builder: AG Vulcan Stettin
- Launched: 1886
- Fate: Sold to Japan, 1903

Japan
- Name: Loong Yue
- Operator: Showa Kosen Gyogyo KK
- Port of registry: (Japan) Tokyo
- Renamed: Ryuyu Maru
- Fate: Scapped 1931

General characteristics
- Tonnage: 2,178 GRT
- Length: 316.0 m (1,036 ft 9 in)
- Beam: 35.4 m (116 ft 2 in)
- Depth: 24.5 m (80 ft 5 in)

The steamship Stettin was a German cargo vessel launched in 1886 built by AG Vulcan Stettin and operated by Norddeutscher Lloyd.

In March 1899, Stettin assisted the German unprotected cruiser SMS Cormoran, which had run aground off New Pomerania.

Stettin was later renamed Loong Yue and then finally was acquired by Showa Kosen Gyogyo KK and rename Ryuyu Maru before ultimately being broken up for scrap in 1931.
