= SS München =

SS München was the name of a number of ships.

- SS München (1922), a Norddeutscher Lloyd liner which was sunk on 9 February 1945 by Soviet submarine S-13 with the loss of over 2,000 lives.
- SS München (1936), a cargo ship which was scuttled by her crew on 2 April 1941 after being intercepted by HMCS Prince Henry.

== See also ==
- SS Munich
