= SMS Bussard =

Unprotected cruiser of the German Imperial Navy

- SMS Bussard, date unknown

History

German Empire
- Name: Bussard
- Laid down: August 1888
- Launched: 23 January 1890
- Commissioned: 7 October 1890
- Decommissioned: 12 March 1910
- Fate: Scrapped, 1913

General characteristics
- Class & type: Bussard-class cruiser
- Displacement: Normal: 1,559 t (1,534 long tons); Full load: 1,868 t (1,838 long tons)
- Length: 82.6 m (271 ft)
- Beam: 12.5 m (41 ft)
- Draft: 4.45 m (14 ft 7 in)
- Installed power: 4 × fire-tube boilers; 2,800 PS (2,800 ihp)
- Propulsion: 2 × triple-expansion steam engines; 2 × screw propellers
- Speed: 15.5 knots (28.7 km/h; 17.8 mph)
- Range: 2,990 nmi (5,540 km) at 9 knots (17 km/h)
- Complement: 9 officers; 152 enlisted men
- Armament: 8 × 10.5 cm (4.1 in) K L/35 guns; 5 × 3.7 cm (1.5 in) Hotchkiss revolver cannon; 2 × 35 cm (13.8 in) torpedo tubes

SMS Bussard ("His Majesty's Ship Bussard—Buzzard") (Note: "SMS" stands for "Seiner Majestät Schiff" (German: His Majesty's Ship).) was an unprotected cruiser of the Imperial German Navy, built in the 1880s. She was the lead ship of her class, which included five other vessels. The cruiser's keel was laid in 1888, and she was launched in January 1890 and commissioned in October of that year. Intended for overseas duty, Bussard was armed with a main battery of eight 10.5-centimeter (4.1 in) guns, and could steam at a speed of 15.5 knots (28.7 km/h; 17.8 mph).

Bussard served abroad for the majority of her career, first in the East Asia Division in the mid-1890s, and in German East Africa for the first decade of the 20th century. She had a relatively peaceful career; her only major action came while stationed in Asia in 1894. There, she assisted in suppressing a local revolt in Samoa. In 1910, she returned to Germany, where she remained in service for only two more years; she was stricken in October 1912 and scrapped the following year in Hamburg.

== Design ==
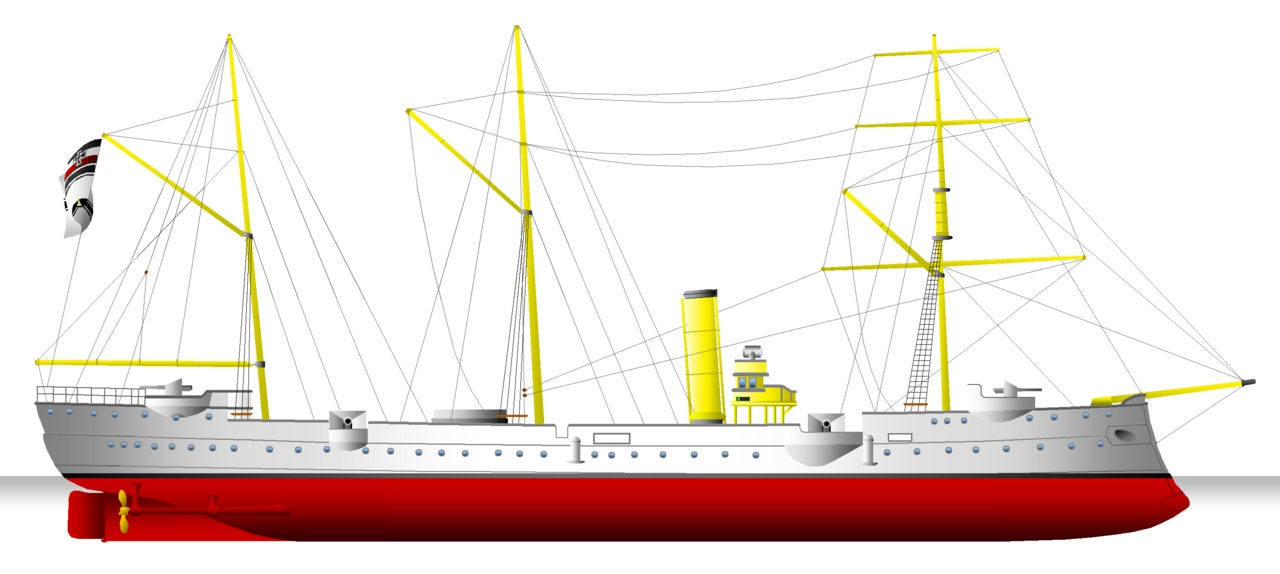
Illustration of the Bussard-class cruiser Geier

Through the 1870s and early 1880s, Germany built two types of cruising vessels: small, fast avisos suitable for service as fleet scouts and larger, long-ranged screw corvettes capable of patrolling the German colonial empire. A pair of new cruisers was authorized under the 1886–1887 fiscal year, intended for the latter purpose. General Leo von Caprivi, the Chief of the Imperial Admiralty, sought to modernize Germany's cruiser force. The first step in the program, the two Schwalbe-class unprotected cruisers, provided the basis for the larger Bussard class.

Bussard was 82.6 meters (271 ft) long overall and had a beam of 12.5 m (41 ft) and a draft of 4.45 m (14.6 ft) forward. She displaced 1,559 t (1,534 long tons) normally and up to 1,868 t (1,838 long tons; 2,059 short tons) at full load. Her propulsion system consisted of two horizontal 3-cylinder triple-expansion steam engines that drove a pair of screw propellers. Steam was provided by four coal-fired cylindrical fire-tube boilers that were ducted into a single funnel. These provided a top speed of 15.5 knots (28.7 km/h; 17.8 mph) from 2,800 metric horsepower (2,800 ihp), and a range of approximately 2,990 nautical miles (5,540 km; 3,440 mi) at 9 kn (17 km/h; 10 mph). She had a crew of 9 officers and 152 enlisted men.

The ship was armed with a main battery of eight 10.5 cm (4.1 in) K L/35 guns in single pedestal mounts, supplied with 800 rounds of ammunition in total. They had a range of 8,200 m (26,900 ft). Two guns were placed side by side forward, two on each broadside in sponsons, and two side by side aft. The gun armament was rounded out by five 3.7 cm (1.5 in) Hotchkiss revolver cannon for defense against torpedo boats. She was also equipped with two 35 cm (13.8 in) torpedo tubes with five torpedoes, both of which were mounted on the deck.

== Service history ==
Bussard was laid down in August 1888 at the Kaiserliche Werft (Imperial Shipyard) in Danzig under the contract name "C". (Note: German warships were ordered under provisional names. Additions to the fleet were given a single letter; ships intended to replace older or lost vessels were ordered as "Ersatz (name of the ship to be replaced)".) She was launched on 23 January 1890; Kapitän zur See (Captain at Sea) Max Schulze performed the christening. Fitting-out work was completed quickly, and the new cruiser was ready for commissioning into the Imperial fleet on 7 October 1890. She thereafter began sea trials, initially based in Danzig, though she later moved to Kiel. Her initial testing was completed on 23 December, and the new cruiser was pronounced ready for active service. Bussard was then temporarily placed out of commission for the winter months.

=== Deployment to the south Pacific, 1891–1898 ===
Bussard early in her career

The ship soon recommissioned on 1 May 1891 for a deployment abroad. The naval command initially planned to send the ship to South American waters to show the flag, but developments in the South Pacific prompted a change of orders that redirected Bussard to Samoa. Before departing Germany, the ship was inspected by Kaiser Wilhelm II in Kiel; she thereafter sailed for the Pacific on 15 August. After sailing through the Mediterranean Sea and across the Indian Ocean, the ship stopped in Sydney, Australia. She arrived in Apia (the capital of Samoa, on the main island of Savaiʻi) on 31 December. Upon arriving there, the ship relieved the unprotected cruiser Sperber, which was released to tour other islands in the region. Bussard remained in Apia for several months to protect German interests in Samoa and to conduct a survey of the harbor. In early 1892, Bussard departed for an overhaul in Auckland, New Zealand, which was conducted from 17 February to 1 April.

She returned to Apia and later in April, the ship sailed to Stephansort in Kaiser-Wilhelmsland, part of German New Guinea. There, she embarked the local colonial governor and a contingent of police and carried them to Hatzfeldhafen on the island of Neupommern in response to the murder of three Germans by the local populace. Bussard then returned the police to Stephansort and sailed north-west to the Hermit Islands, arriving on 25 April. She sent a landing party ashore to suppress unrest against German colonial rule. Bussard then sailed to Herbertshöhe, Neupommern, to transport a police detachment to Nusa on Neumecklenburg on 1 June, again in response to the murder of a German national. Bussard next visited the Tasman Islands and Lord Howe Atoll in the Solomon Islands, and from there cruised to the Marshall Islands. On 16 June, she arrived back in Apia and met Sperber there. Bussard got underway again eight days later to patrol through the German colonial holdings in New Guinea. By 6 August, she had arrived in Sydney for another overhaul during which Korvettenkapitän (KK—Corvette Captain) Otto Flichtenhöfer arrived to take command of the ship. This work was completed by 16 September, and Bussard was back at anchor in Apia eleven days later. While there, Bussard was forced to sail to Pago Pago by a hurricane, a decision made necessary after the 1889 Apia cyclone had wrecked several German and American ships in the harbor.

In early 1893, Bussard sailed south once again for periodic maintenance, this time carried out at Auckland, from 18 January to 23 March. At the end of the month, the ship visited Tonga to participate in a celebration marking the coronation of King George Tupou II. The ship's presence there was in part intended to counter claims in the Australian and New Zealand press that Germany intended to annex the island kingdom. From there, Bussard sailed to Sydney and then north to Friedrich-Wilhelmshafen in Kaiser-Wilhelmsland, where she met the steamer SS Ysabell. Bussard then toured several islands around Neuhannover, followed by visits to several islands in the Marshalls. On 13 May, she sailed for Apia, arriving on 14 June. The ship was soon sent to suppress unrest on neighboring Upolu, the other main Samoan island. She was joined there by her sister ship Falke and the old British corvette HMS Curacoa. On 7 July, they bombarded rebel forces, which were led by Mata'afa Iosefo; the attack forced them to surrender, and Mata'afa was taken to Apia, while Bussard remained behind to ensure the demilitarization of his supporters. Mata'afa was thereafter deported to Jaluit in the Marshalls aboard Sperber. In mid-November, Bussard made another trip to Auckland for an overhaul; at that time Flichtenhöfer left the ship, being temporarily relieved by the executive officer, Kapitänleutnant (Captain Lieutenant) Hugo Kinderling. She then met Falke in Sydney on 24 March 1894. KK Georg Scheder arrived there to take permanent command. The two vessels cruised back to Apia, arriving on 15 May.

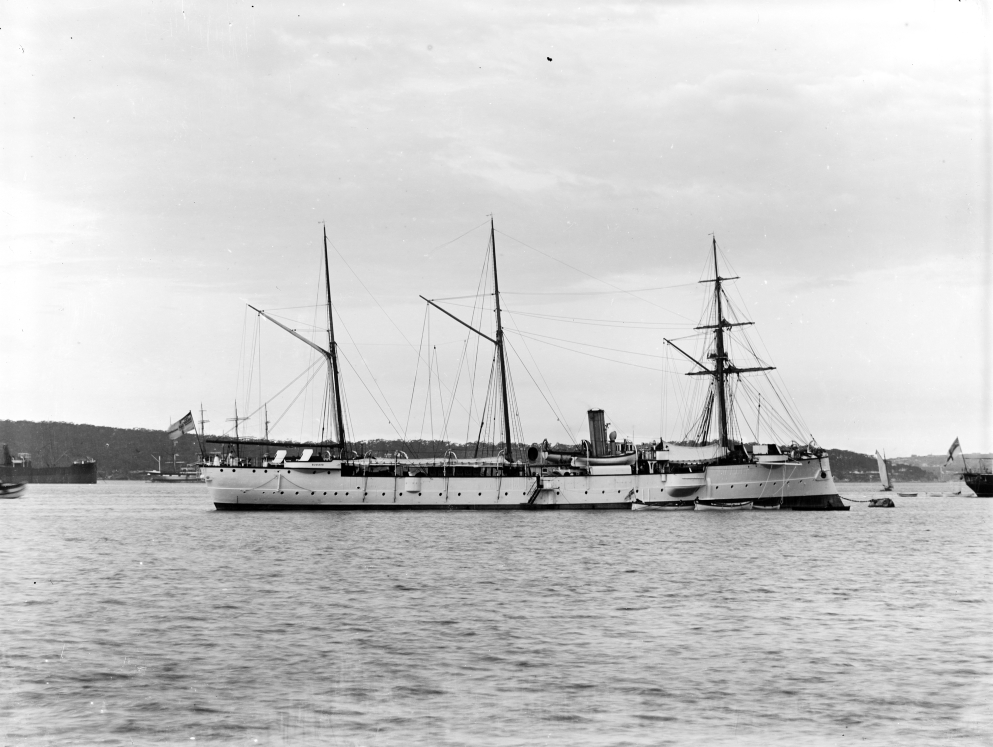
Bussard in Sydney, Australia in the 1890s

Another period of unrest broke out again on Savaiʻi in June, which threatened to spread to Apia. Bussard, Falke, and Curacoa again assembled and shelled the rebels before deploying landing parties, which ended the fighting. The Europeans seized weapons and had restored order by 13 August. Bussard returned to Auckland for another overhaul that lasted from 11 December to 12 February 1895. She thereafter toured several ports in New Zealand, before sailing to Sydney to meet Falke and the gunboat Möwe, which had been sent to reinforce German naval forces in the region. Bussard then returned to Apia, arriving on 23 June, where she resumed surveying work in the harbor. She remained in the port until October, when she departed again for an overhaul in Sydney. At that time, KK Raimund Winkler arrived to relieve Scheder. Another period of shipyard repairs was carried out in Sydney from 30 January to 1 May 1896, after which Bussard cruised in German New Guinea. During this period, she stopped in Matupi, Herbertshöhe, and Mioko Island between late May and early June. Later that month, she visited Lord Howe Atoll and Nauru. On 27 June, Bussard received a request to sail to several islands in the Ratak Chain, part of the Marshall Islands; there, she was to disarm rebels fighting the Marshallese government. While operating off the islands of Majuro, Arno, and Ailinglaplap, the ship also conducted a survey of the region.

Bussard then sailed back to Apia, arriving on 27 July. In late August, she departed for another trip to Sydney, but upon arrival in September, the ship received orders to return to Apia owing to renewed unrest on the islands. By January 1897, the scheduled overhaul could no longer be deferred, and she returned to Auckland for the work. This was followed by a visit to Sydney in February and March, and another visit to Auckland from mid-September to mid-October. The ship next moved to the Bismarck Archipelago in mid-November, where she joined Falke, which had been sent to suppress rebellion against German rule. Not long after, Bussard was sent to the Marshalls, anchoring off Jaluit from 26 November to 13 December. She then returned to German New Guinea, stopping at Herbertshöhe from 21 December to mid-February 1898. While there, Winkler was replaced by KK Otto Mandt. The ship then returned to Sydney for another overhaul that lasted for two and a half months. By 21 May, Bussard had anchored back in Apia. On 30 August, she sailed to the Marshalls to embark Mata'afa, whose exile from Samoa had ended; the ship arrived back in Samoa with him on 19 September. Having received orders home soon thereafter, Bussard departed for Germany on 18 November. While on the way home, her orders were amended to redirect the ship to Morocco, to force the local authorities to stop harassing German merchants in the country. This was carried out between 24 and 29 March 1899. She reached Kiel on 9 April. On the return voyage, she carried several tropical birds for the Berlin Zoological Garden.

After her arrival, Bussard went into drydock at the Kaiserliche Werft in Danzig for reconstruction, being decommissioned there on 20 April. The barque rig was cut down to a top-sail schooner rig, reducing the sail area from 850 m^{2} (9,100 sq ft) to 600 m^{2} (6,500 sq ft). A new, larger conning tower structure was built. Work was completed by 1900, when Bussard returned to service.

=== Deployment to East Asia, 1900–1904 ===
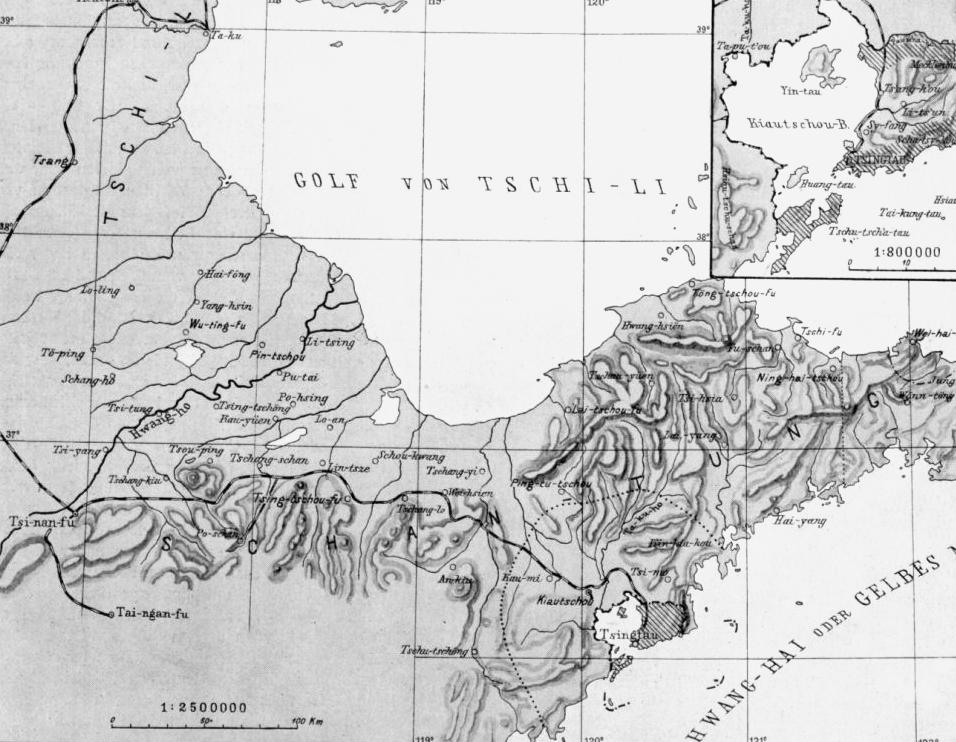
German 1912 map of the Shandong Peninsula showing the Kiautschou Bay Leased Territory

Bussard next recommissioned on 26 June 1900 under the command of KK Adolph von Bassewitz; she was sent to East Asia in response to the Boxer Uprising in Qing China. The ship got underway already on 10 July, steaming in company with the four Brandenburg-class battleships and other vessels being sent to reinforce the Eight Nation Alliance there. While en route to China on 6 August, a boiler room exploded aboard Bussard, due to a blown out manhole gasket; the explosion killed two sailors and seriously wounded another three men. The ship had to stop at Aden for repairs to the boiler. Bussard then sailed on to Singapore, arriving on 4 September. There, she formally came under command of the East Asia Squadron; she was initially ordered to Xiamen and then to Shantou, but by the end of the year, she was moved to Qingdao, where the Germans had a naval base at the Kiautschou Bay Leased Territory. The ship returned to the Xiamen and Shantou areas, and later she entered the Yangtze river, patrolling as far upriver as Hankou. It was originally planned to transfer Bussard to German East Africa in May, but it was decided the crisis in China precluded her reassignment. From 7 to 17 September, the ship returned to Qingdao. Two days later, she sailed for Nagasaki, Japan, for an overhaul that lasted until 4 December. She thereafter returned to Chinese waters, stopping in Hong Kong on 19 December.

On 3 January 1902, Bussard sailed to tour the Dutch East Indies, cruising at times with the protected cruiser Hertha, the flagship of the East Asia Squadron. During the voyage, Bussard also stopped in the British colonies at Labuan, North Borneo; and Penang in the Straits Settlements. On the way back north, she visited Hong Kong again before returning to Qingdao, where she lay from 9 to 28 April. The ship then returned to the southern Chinese coast around Xiamen and Shantou. This period was interrupted by trips to Qingdao from 23 May to 9 June and then from 9 August to 10 October, followed by a return to Nagasaki from 21 October to 17 December. In early 1903, Bussard sailed back to her previous patrol area off the southern Chinese coast. From 24 June to 31 August, she made another visit to Japan, stopping in the ports of Kobe, Yokohama, and Hakodate, and then Vladivostok, Russia, on her way back to Chinese waters. After a short docking at Qingdao that began on 29 September, Bussard made another trip to Kobe later that year, and toward the end of 1903, she embarked on another cruise south to the Dutch East Indies. When the Russo-Japanese War broke out in February 1904, Bussard received orders to sail to Chemulpo, Korea, to relieve the gunboat Tiger, which had been stationed there. Bussard remained there for the next tow months, making only short trips across the Yellow Sea to replenish supplies in Qingdao. On 10 April, she left the port for the last time, having been replaced by her sister Geier; two days later, Bussard received orders to sail for East Africa.

=== Operations in Africa, 1904–1910 ===
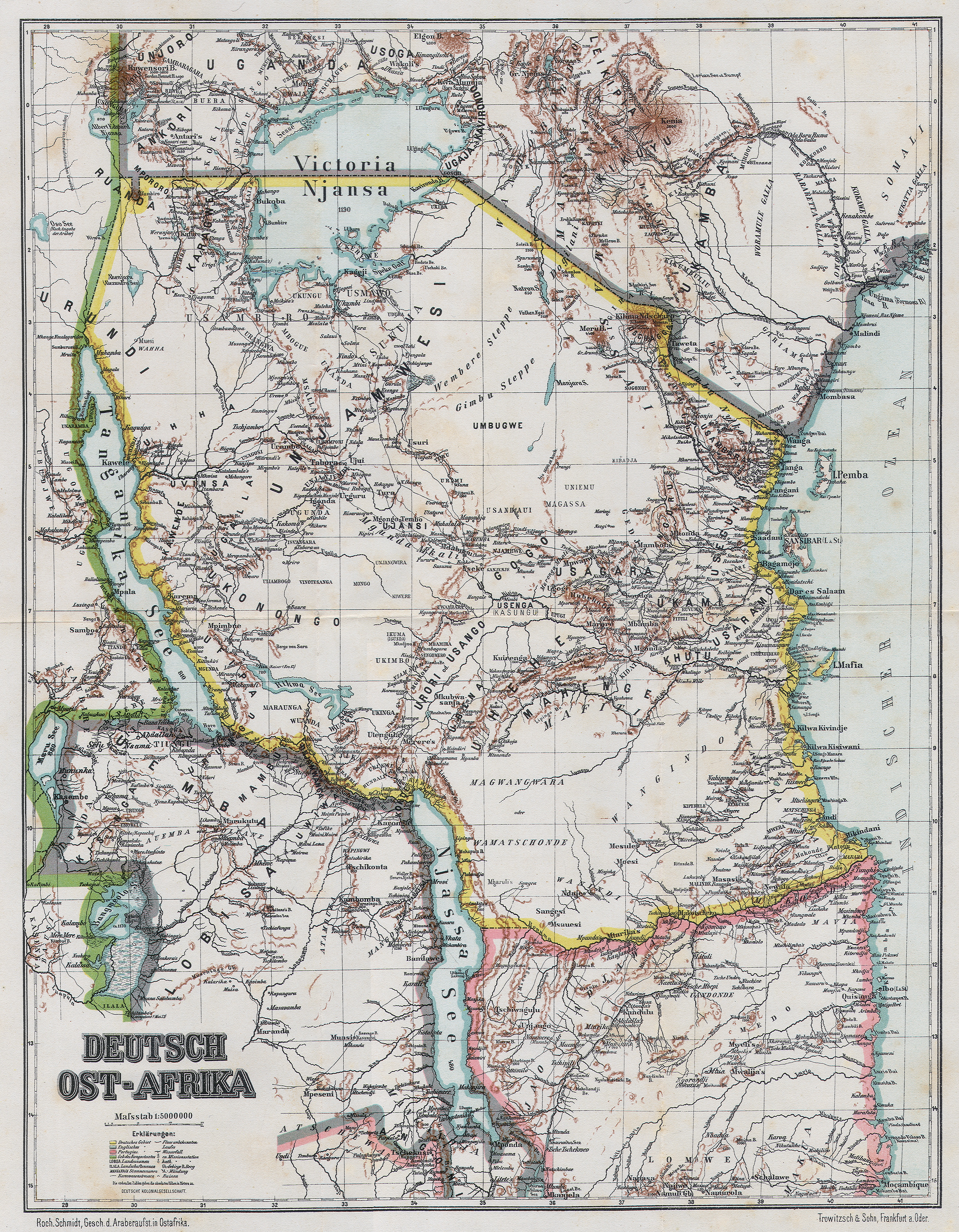
Contemporary map of German East Africa

Bussard sailed from Qingdao for the last time on 26 April 1904, bound for Dar es Salaam in German East Africa. While the ship was en route, KK Otto Back came aboard to take command. She arrived there on 30 June, and soon thereafter began an inspection tour of the coast as far north as Mombasa in what was then the British East Africa Protectorate. The tour, which began on 13 July, concluded on 31 August. Beginning on 11 November, she cruised south to visit Portuguese Mozambique and the Zanzibar islands. On 6 February 1905, Hertha joined Bussard in Dar es Salaam while the former was on her way home to Germany. The two ships cruised together to Tanga, where they parted company; Bussard sailed south to Cape Town in the British Cape Colony for periodic maintenance. The work was finished by 3 April, allowing Bussard to return north. While passing along the coast of Mozambique, she joined in the salvage effort for the merchant ship SS Regina, which had run aground there. Between 25 April and 21 June, she attempted to pull Regina free, but was unable to dislodge the stranded vessel.

Not long after Bussard arrived back in German East Africa, the Maji Maji Rebellion broke out against German rule. The colonial governor, Gustav Adolf von Götzen, ordered Bussard to join the effort to suppress the uprising on 3 August. The ship was used to carry elements of the 5th Company of the Schutztruppe (Protection Force) to Kilwa Kiwindische on 3 August; she also contributed a landing party of twenty men led by an officer and a petty officer, equipped with rifles and a machine gun, to strengthen the town's defenses. The landing party moved to Ssamanga on 6 August, and a second detachment of twenty-two men with an officer was sent aboard the steamer SS Kingani up the Rufiji River to Mohoro. Soon thereafter, the garrison at Mohoro was reinforced by another twelve men, led by Bussard's executive officer; another five men and an officer were sent ashore at the mouth of the Kingani River. The ship's crew had been depleted so severely that twenty-five local men were hired to keep the cruiser operational. By 13 August, the area had been secured to the extent that most of the landing parties could be returned to the ship.

The situation in East Africa quickly worsened, prompting Götzen to request reinforcements. Bussard sailed to Lindi on 20 August and sent men ashore to secure the town, initially with a group of one officer and twelve men. A detachment of one officer and eight men was sent to nearby Mikindani. The garrison at Lindi soon required extensive reinforcements, to the point that Bussard was left with just the commander and thirty-three men aboard. On 15 September, the Österreichischer Lloyd steamer SS Körber arrived with a contingent of 53 sailors and non-commissioned officers to keep Bussard operational, along with a naval infantry detachment of 9 officers and 219 soldiers. The naval infantry were initially sent to Dar es Salaam and then dispersed inland, while Bussard continued coastal operations to defend port towns. On 21 September, Bussard sent a mixed landing party ashore at Bagamoyo.

The light cruiser Thetis arrived in Dar es Salaam on 26 September; the ship's captain outranked Back, and so became overall commander of naval forces in the colony. Bussard's sister Seeadler arrived on 1 October, further reducing the demands on the former's crew. The men from Bussard were relieved, but the respite proved to be temporary as fighting broke out again around Mohoro. Bussard and Seeadler sent a combined landing party ashore at Kiswere on 16 October and then resumed cruising along the coast with Thetis. On 9 December, Bussard returned to Dar es Salaam for repairs that lasted until late January 1906. Combat operations against the various rebel groups followed through the rest of 1905. By December, the Schutztruppe had largely contained the rebellion, and in early 1906, the naval detachments returned to their ships. By 11 February, Bussard's crew was back at full strength. In the course of the fighting, her crew had suffered three killed.

On 29 March, Thetis left East African waters, leaving Bussard and Seeadler on the station. Bussard spent the next month touring ports in the colony before sailing south for periodic maintenance at Cape Town from 11 May to 18 June. The next three years passed uneventfully for the ship, which spent most of this time patrolling the coast of German East Africa. The only interruptions were repair periods from 17 February to 16 March 1907 in Cape Town and from 12 May to 17 June 1908 in Durban in the British Colony of Natal. Bussard ended 1908 with a more extensive overhaul at Cape Town from 16 November to 28 December. In 1909, the ship returned to Cape Town for repairs from 10 September to 16 October. But the ship's poor condition by that point led the naval command to recall Bussard at the end of the year. She sailed from Dar es Salaam on 14 December and arrived in Kiel on 26 February 1910. She was then moved to Danzig, where she was decommissioned on 12 March. She remained in reserve for the next two years before being stricken from the naval register on 25 October 1912. Bussard was broken up the following year at Lemwerder.
