= List of cruisers of Germany =

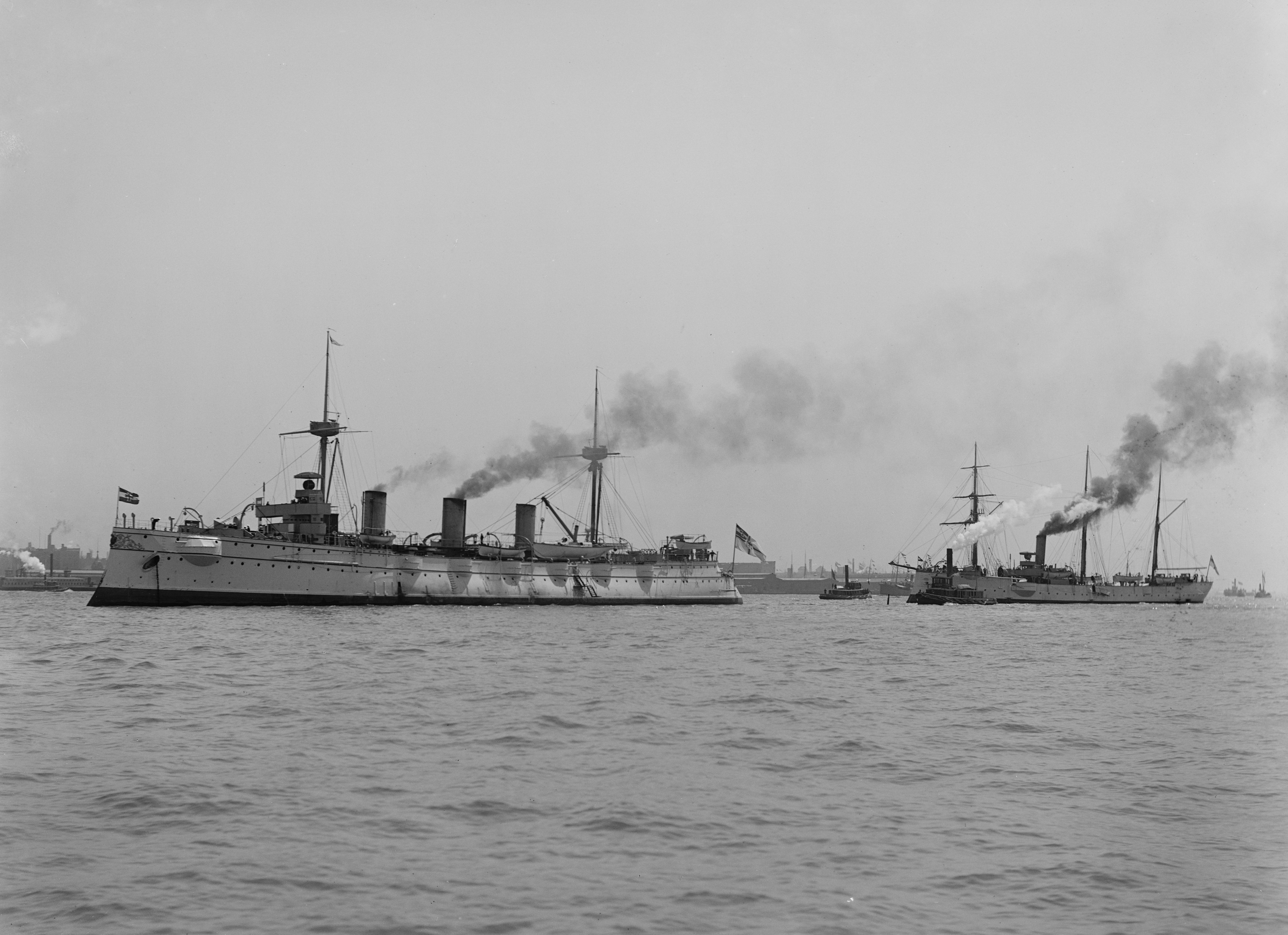
Kaiserin Augusta and Seeadler, two of Germany's earliest cruisers, in New York in 1893

Starting in the 1880s, the German Kaiserliche Marine (Imperial Navy) began building a series of cruisers. The first designs—protected and unprotected—were ordered to replace aging sail and steam-powered frigates and corvettes that were of minimal combat value. After several iterations of each type, these cruisers were developed into armored and light cruisers, respectively, over the following decade. They were built to fill a variety of roles, including scouts for the main battle fleet and colonial cruisers for Germany's overseas empire. The armored cruisers in turn led to the first German battlecruiser, SMS Von der Tann.

The protected and unprotected cruisers had been withdrawn from active service by the 1910s, though some continued in secondary roles. Most of the armored and light cruisers saw action in World War I, in all of the major theaters of the conflict. Their service ranged from commerce raiding patrols on the open ocean to the fleet engagements in the North Sea such as the Battle of Jutland. Many were sunk in the course of the war, and the majority of the remainder were either seized as war prizes by the victorious Allies, scuttled by their crews in Scapa Flow in 1919, or broken up for scrap. The Treaty of Versailles forced Germany to surrender most of its remaining vessels. Only six old pre-dreadnought battleships and six old light cruisers could be kept on active duty. These ships could be replaced when they reached twenty years of age, and the cruisers were limited to a displacement of 6,000 metric tons (5,900 long tons; 6,600 short tons).

In the 1920s, Germany began a modest program to rebuild its fleet, now renamed the Reichsmarine. It began with the new light cruiser, Emden, in 1921, followed by five more light cruisers and three new heavy cruisers, the Deutschland class. A further five heavy cruisers—the Admiral Hipper class—were ordered in the mid-1930s, though only the first three were completed. At the same time, the German navy was renamed the Kriegsmarine. Plan Z, a more ambitious reconstruction program that called for twelve P-class cruisers, was approved in early 1939 but was cancelled before the end of the year following the outbreak of World War II. Of the six heavy cruisers and six light cruisers that were finished, only two survived the war. One, Prinz Eugen, was sunk following nuclear weapons tests during Operation Crossroads in 1946; the other, Nürnberg, saw service in the Soviet Navy until she was scrapped around 1960. (Note: The German navies also operated numerous auxiliary cruisers during both world wars, including SMS Seeadler and Kormoran. As they were armed merchant ships and not purpose-built warships, they are not within the scope of this list.)

Key
Armament	The number and type of the primary armament
Armor	The thickness of the deck or belt armor
Displacement	Ship displacement at full combat load (Note: Historian Erich Gröner states that full load was defined as "[equal to] type displacement plus full load fuel oil, diesel oil, coal, reserve boiler feed water, aircraft fuel, and special equipment." See: Gröner, p. ix.)
Propulsion	Number of shafts, type of propulsion system, and top speed generated
Cost	Cost of the ship's construction
Service	The dates work began and finished on the ship and its ultimate fate
Laid down	The date the keel began to be assembled
Commissioned	The date the ship was commissioned

== Protected cruisers ==
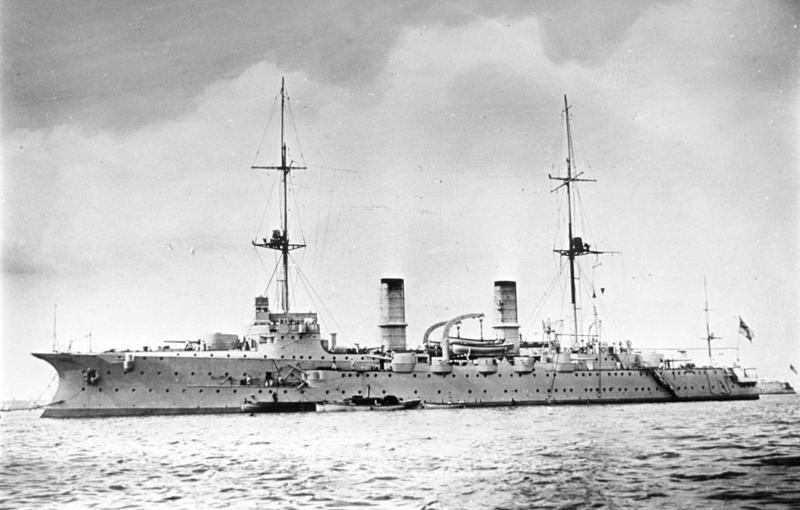
Hansa, of the Victoria Louise class

Starting in the mid-1880s, the German Navy began to modernize its cruising force, which at that time relied on a mixed collection of sail and steam frigates and corvettes. General Leo von Caprivi, then the Chief of the Kaiserliche Marine (Imperial Navy), ordered several new warships, including two Irene-class cruisers laid down in 1886, the first protected cruisers to be built in Germany. Design work on their successor, Kaiserin Augusta, began the following year, though she was not laid down until 1890. Five more ships of the Victoria Louise class followed in the mid-1890s. These ships, the last protected cruisers built in Germany, provided the basis for the armored cruisers that were built starting at the end of the decade. All of these ships were intended to serve both as fleet scouts and overseas cruisers, since Germany's limited naval budget prevented development of ships optimized for each task.

Most of the German protected cruisers served on overseas stations throughout their careers, primarily in the East Asia Squadron in the 1890s and 1900s. Prinzess Wilhelm participated in the seizure of the Jiaozhou Bay Leased Territory in November 1897, which was used as the primary base for the East Asia Squadron. Kaiserin Augusta, Hertha, and Hansa assisted in the suppression of the Boxer Uprising in China in 1900, and Vineta saw action during the Venezuelan crisis of 1902–03, where she bombarded several Venezuelan fortresses. Irene, Prinzess Wilhelm, and Kaiserin Augusta were relegated to secondary duties in the 1910s, while the Victoria Louise class was used to train naval cadets in the 1900s. All eight ships were broken up for scrap in the early 1920s.

Ship	Armament	Armor	Displacement	Propulsion	Service		
Ship	Armament	Armor	Displacement	Propulsion	Laid down	Commissioned	Fate
Irene	4 × 15 cm K L/30 guns 10 × 15 cm K L/22	20 mm (0.79 in)	5,027 t (4,948 long tons)	2 shafts, 2 reciprocating engines, 18 knots (33 km/h; 21 mph)	1886	25 May 1888	Scrapped, 1922
Prinzess Wilhelm	4 × 15 cm K L/30 guns 10 × 15 cm K L/22	20 mm (0.79 in)	5,027 t (4,948 long tons)	2 shafts, 2 reciprocating engines, 18 knots (33 km/h; 21 mph)	1886	13 November 1889	Scrapped, 1922
Kaiserin Augusta	12 × 15 cm SK L/35 guns	50 mm (2.0 in)	6,318 t (6,218 long tons)	3 shafts, 3 triple-expansion engines, 21 knots (39 km/h; 24 mph)	1890	17 November 1892	Scrapped, 1920
Victoria Louise	2 × 21 cm SK L/40 guns 8 × 15 cm SK L/40 guns	40 mm (1.6 in)	6,491 t (6,388 long tons)	3 shafts, triple-expansion engines, 19.5 knots (36.1 km/h; 22.4 mph)	1895	20 February 1899	Scrapped, 1923
Hertha	2 × 21 cm SK L/40 guns 8 × 15 cm SK L/40 guns	40 mm (1.6 in)	6,491 t (6,388 long tons)	3 shafts, triple-expansion engines, 19.5 knots (36.1 km/h; 22.4 mph)	1895	23 July 1898	Scrapped, 1920
Freya	2 × 21 cm SK L/40 guns 8 × 15 cm SK L/40 guns	40 mm (1.6 in)	6,491 t (6,388 long tons)	3 shafts, triple-expansion engines, 19.5 knots (36.1 km/h; 22.4 mph)	1895	20 October 1898	Scrapped, 1921
Vineta	2 × 21 cm SK L/40 guns 8 × 15 cm SK L/40 guns	40 mm (1.6 in)	6,705 t (6,599 long tons)	3 shafts, triple-expansion engines, 18.5 knots (34.3 km/h; 21.3 mph)	1896	13 September 1899	Scrapped, 1920
Hansa	2 × 21 cm SK L/40 guns 8 × 15 cm SK L/40 guns	40 mm (1.6 in)	6,705 t (6,599 long tons)	3 shafts, triple-expansion engines, 18.5 knots (34.3 km/h; 21.3 mph)	1896	20 April 1899	Scrapped, 1920

== Unprotected cruisers ==
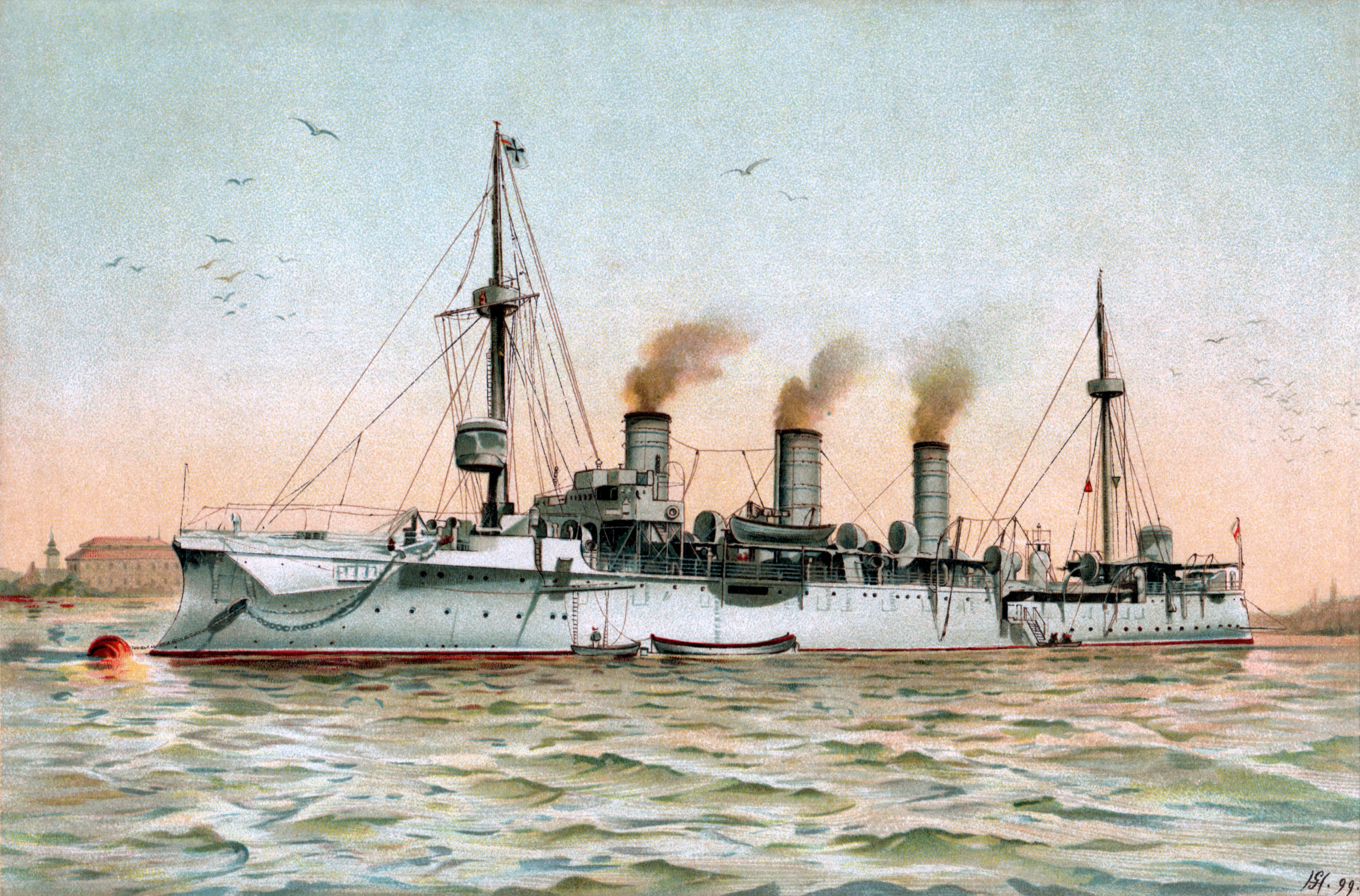
A 1902 lithograph of SMS Gefion

At the same time that Caprivi began ordering new protected cruisers, he also authorized the construction of smaller unprotected cruisers for use in Germany's overseas colonies. The first of these, the Schwalbe class, were laid down in 1886 and 1887. A further six vessels of the Bussard class, which were improved versions that were larger and faster than their predecessors, followed over the next five years. A final, much larger vessel, Gefion, was laid down in 1892; her design was based on contemporary protected cruisers like Kaiserin Augusta. She represented another attempt to merge the colonial cruiser and fleet scout, which was unsuccessful. As a result, the German naval designers began work on the Gazelle class, which provided the basis for all future German light cruisers.

All nine cruisers served extensively in Germany's colonies, particularly in Africa and Asia. They participated in the suppression of numerous rebellions, including the Abushiri Revolt in German East Africa in 1889–1890, the Boxer Uprising in China in 1900–1901, and the Sokehs Rebellion in the Caroline Islands in 1911. Most of the ships had been recalled to Germany and decommissioned by the early 1910s, having been replaced by the newer light cruisers. Bussard and Falke were scrapped in 1912, but the rest continued on in secondary roles. Of the remaining seven ships, only Cormoran and Geier remained abroad at the start of World War I in August 1914. Cormoran was stationed in Qingdao, but her engines were worn out, so she was scuttled to prevent her capture. Geier briefly operated against British shipping in the Pacific before running low on coal. She put into Hawaii, where she was interned by the US Navy. After the United States declared war on Germany in April 1917, she was seized and commissioned into American service as USS Schurz, though she was accidentally sunk in a collision in June 1918. Seeadler, employed as a mine storage hulk in Wilhelmshaven during the war, was destroyed by an accidental explosion in 1917. Condor, Schwalbe, and Sperber were all broken up for scrap in the early 1920s, while Gefion was briefly used as a freighter, before she too was scrapped, in 1923.

Ship	Armament	Armor	Displacement	Propulsion	Service		
Ship	Armament	Armor	Displacement	Propulsion	Laid down	Commissioned	Fate
Schwalbe	8 × 10.5 cm K L/35 guns	—	1,359 t (1,338 long tons)	2 × 2-cylinder double-expansion steam engines, 13.5 knots (25.0 km/h; 15.5 mph)	April 1886	8 May 1888	Scrapped, 1922
Sperber	8 × 10.5 cm K L/35 guns	—	1,359 t (1,338 long tons)	2 × 2-cylinder double-expansion steam engines, 13.5 knots (25.0 km/h; 15.5 mph)	September 1887	2 April 1889	Scrapped, 1922
Bussard	8 × 10.5 cm K L/35 guns	—	1,868 t (1,838 long tons)	2 × 2-cylinder double-expansion steam engines, 15.5 knots (28.7 km/h; 17.8 mph)	1888	7 October 1890	Scrapped, 1913
Falke	8 × 10.5 cm SK L/35 guns	—	1,868 t (1,838 long tons)	2 × 2-cylinder double-expansion steam engines, 15.5 knots (28.7 km/h; 17.8 mph)	1890	14 September 1891	Scrapped, 1913
Seeadler	8 × 10.5 cm SK L/35 guns	—	1,868 t (1,838 long tons)	2 × 2-cylinder double-expansion steam engines, 15.5 knots (28.7 km/h; 17.8 mph)	1890	17 August 1892	Destroyed, 1917
Condor	8 × 10.5 cm SK L/35 guns	—	1,868 t (1,838 long tons)	2 × 2-cylinder double-expansion steam engines, 15.5 knots (28.7 km/h; 17.8 mph)	1891	9 December 1892	Scrapped, 1921
Cormoran	8 × 10.5 cm SK L/35 guns	—	1,868 t (1,838 long tons)	2 × 2-cylinder double-expansion steam engines, 15.5 knots (28.7 km/h; 17.8 mph)	1890	25 July 1893	Scuttled, 28 September 1914
Geier	8 × 10.5 cm SK L/35 guns	—	1,868 t (1,838 long tons)	2 × 2-cylinder double-expansion steam engines, 15.5 knots (28.7 km/h; 17.8 mph)	1893	24 October 1895	Captured, 6 April 1917, sunk 21 June 1918
Gefion	10 × 10.5 cm SK L/35 guns	25 mm	4,275 t (4,207 long tons)	2 × 3-cylinder triple expansion engines, 20.5 knots (38.0 km/h; 23.6 mph)	1892	5 June 1895	Converted to freighter, 1920, scrapped 1923

== Armored cruisers ==
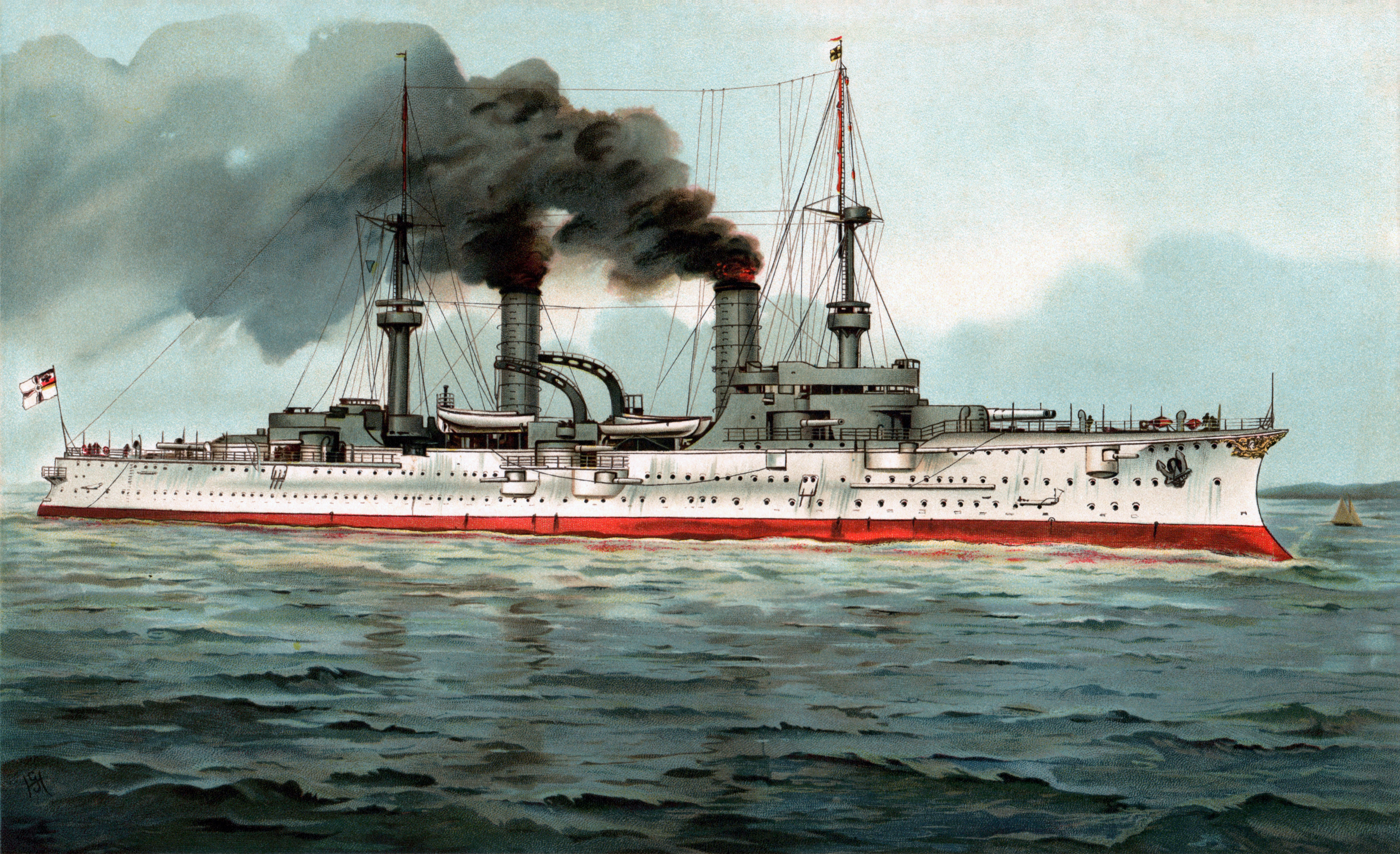
A lithograph of Fürst Bismarck, Germany's first armored cruiser

The first armored cruiser, Fürst Bismarck, was ordered shortly after the Victoria Louise class of protected cruisers. Fürst Bismarck was an improved version of the earlier type, with heavier armament, more extensive armor protection, and a significantly greater size. A further seven units, divided between four different designs, followed over the next ten years; each design provided incremental improvements over earlier vessels. A ninth armored cruiser, Blücher, was a much larger vessel representing an intermediate step between armored cruisers and battlecruisers. Indeed, her design had been influenced by the misinformation Britain had released about its Invincible-class battlecruisers, which were then under construction. Once the characteristics of the new ships were revealed, Germany began building battlecruisers in response.

Germany's armored cruisers served in a variety of roles, including overseas as flagships of the East Asia Squadron, and in the fleet reconnaissance forces. All of them, save Fürst Bismarck, saw action during World War I in a variety of theaters. Blücher served with the battlecruisers in the I Scouting Group and was sunk at the Battle of Dogger Bank in 1915, and the two Scharnhorst-class cruisers formed the core of Maximilian von Spee's squadron that defeated the British at the Battle of Coronel in November 1914 before being annihilated at the Battle of the Falkland Islands. Yorck was accidentally sunk by a German mine in November 1914 outside Wilhelmshaven, and the two Prinz Adalbert-class cruisers were sunk in the Baltic Sea. Only Prinz Heinrich and Roon survived the war; both were scrapped in the early 1920s.

Ship	Armament	Armor	Displacement	Propulsion	Service		
Ship	Armament	Armor	Displacement	Propulsion	Laid down	Commissioned	Fate
Fürst Bismarck	4 × 24 cm (9.4 in) SK L/40; 10 × 15 cm (5.9 in) SK L/40 guns	200 mm (7.9 in)	11,461 t (11,280 long tons)	3 screws, triple expansion engines, 18.7 knots (34.6 km/h; 21.5 mph)	1896	1 April 1900	Broken up for scrap in 1919–1920
Prinz Heinrich	2 × 24 cm (9.4 in) SK L/40; 10 × 15 cm (5.9 in) SK L/40 guns	100 mm (3.9 in)	9,806 t (9,651 long tons)	3 screws, triple expansion engines, 19.9 knots (36.9 km/h; 22.9 mph)	1898	11 March 1902	Broken up for scrap in 1920
Prinz Adalbert	4 × 21 cm (8.3 in) SK L/40; 10 × 15 cm (5.9 in) SK L/40 guns	100 mm (3.9 in)	9,875 t (9,719 long tons)	3 screws, triple expansion engines, 20.4 knots (37.8 km/h; 23.5 mph)	1900	12 January 1904	Sunk on 23 October 1915 by HMS E8
Friedrich Carl	4 × 21 cm (8.3 in) SK L/40; 10 × 15 cm (5.9 in) SK L/40 guns	100 mm (3.9 in)	9,875 t (9,719 long tons)	3 screws, triple expansion engines, 20.5 knots (38.0 km/h; 23.6 mph)	1901	12 December 1903	Sunk on 17 November 1914 by Russian mines
Roon	4 × 21 cm SK L/40; 10 × 15 cm (5.9 in) SK L/40 guns	100 mm (3.9 in)	10,266 t (10,104 long tons)	3 screws, triple expansion engines, 21.1 knots (39.1 km/h; 24.3 mph)	1902	5 April 1906	Broken up for scrap in 1921
Yorck	4 × 21 cm SK L/40; 10 × 15 cm (5.9 in) SK L/40 guns	100 mm (3.9 in)	10,266 t (10,104 long tons)	3 screws, triple expansion engines, 21.4 knots (39.6 km/h; 24.6 mph)	1903	21 November 1905	Sunk on 4 November 1914 by German mines
Scharnhorst	8 × 21 cm SK L/40; 6 × 15 cm (5.9 in) SK L/40 guns	150 mm (5.9 in)	12,985 t (12,780 long tons)	3 screws, triple expansion engines, 23.5 knots (43.5 km/h; 27.0 mph)	1905	24 October 1907	Sunk on 8 December 1914 at the Battle of the Falkland Islands
Gneisenau	8 × 21 cm SK L/40; 6 × 15 cm (5.9 in) SK L/40 guns	150 mm (5.9 in)	12,985 t (12,780 long tons)	3 screws, triple expansion engines, 23.6 knots (43.7 km/h; 27.2 mph)	1904	6 March 1908	Sunk on 8 December 1914 at the Battle of the Falkland Islands
Blücher	12 × 21 cm SK L/45; 8 × 15 cm (5.9 in) SK L/45 guns	180 mm (7.1 in)	17,500 t (17,200 long tons)	3 screws, triple expansion engines, 25.4 knots (47.0 km/h; 29.2 mph)	21 February 1907	1 October 1909	Sunk on 24 January 1915 at the Battle of Dogger Bank

== Light cruisers ==
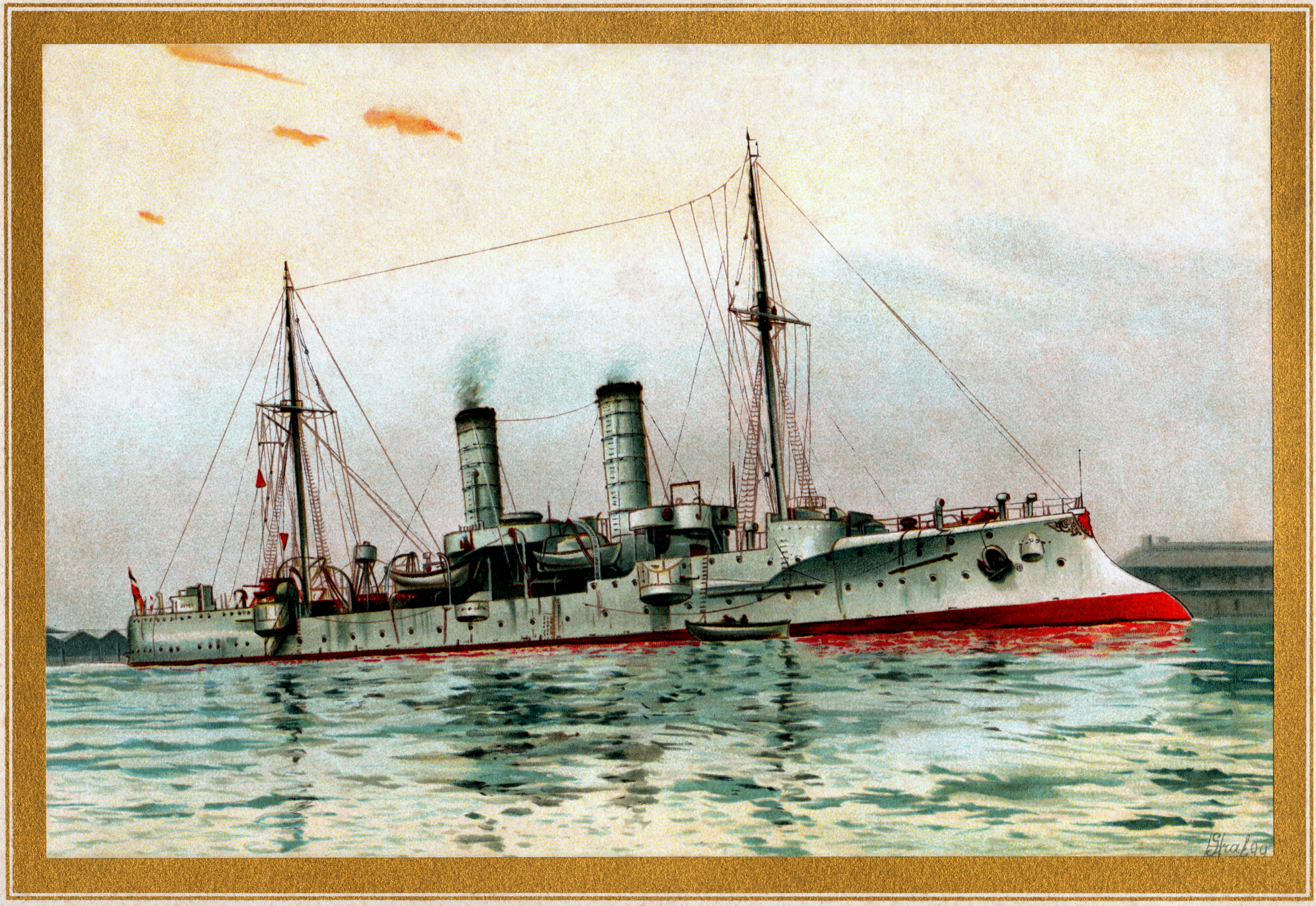
A lithograph of SMS Gazelle, the first modern light cruiser built by Germany

Starting in the late 1890s, the Kaiserliche Marine began developing modern light cruisers, based on experience with the unprotected cruisers and a series of avisos it had built over the preceding decade. The ten-ship Gazelle class set the basic pattern, which was gradually improved over successive classes. The Pillau class introduced more powerful, 15-centimeter (5.9 in) main guns, and the Magdeburg class added a waterline main belt to improve armor protection. Between 1897 and the end of World War I, the German Navy completed forty-seven light cruisers; all of these ships saw service during the war in a variety of theaters and roles. Some, such as Emden and Königsberg, served as commerce raiders, while others, such as the two Wiesbaden-class cruisers, served with the High Seas Fleet and saw action at the Battle of Jutland in 1916. Several fleet cruiser design studies were prepared in 1916, but no work was begun before the war ended in November 1918.

Following the war, the Treaty of Versailles forced Germany to cede all of its most modern light cruisers; only eight Gazelle and Bremen-class cruisers were permitted under the terms of the treaty. These ships could be replaced after twenty years from the time they were launched, and the first new vessel, Emden, was laid down in 1921. Five more ships of the Königsberg and Leipzig classes were built between 1926 and 1935. These six cruisers all saw combat during World War II; two, Königsberg and Karlsruhe, were sunk during the invasion of Norway in April 1940. Emden and Köln were destroyed by Allied bombers in the closing months of the war, and Leipzig was discarded after being badly damaged in a collision with the heavy cruiser Prinz Eugen. This left Nürnberg as the only vessel of the type to survive the war. She was seized by the Soviet Union as a war prize and continued in Soviet service until she was scrapped in 1960.

Ship	Armament	Armor	Displacement	Propulsion	Service		
Ship	Armament	Armor	Displacement	Propulsion	Laid down	Commissioned	Fate
Gazelle	10 × 10.5 cm SK L/40 guns	25 mm (0.98 in)	2,963 t (2,916 long tons)	2 shafts, 2 reciprocating engines, 19.5 knots (36.1 km/h; 22.4 mph)	1897	15 June 1901	Scrapped, 1920
Niobe	10 × 10.5 cm SK L/40 guns	25 mm (0.98 in)	2,963 t (2,916 long tons)	2 shafts, 2 reciprocating engines, 21.5 knots (39.8 km/h; 24.7 mph)	1898	25 June 1900	Destroyed, 19 December 1943
Nymphe	10 × 10.5 cm SK L/40 guns	25 mm (0.98 in)	3,017 t (2,969 long tons)	2 shafts, 2 reciprocating engines, 21.5 knots (39.8 km/h; 24.7 mph)	1898	20 September 1900	Scrapped, 1932
Thetis	10 × 10.5 cm SK L/40 guns	25 mm (0.98 in)	3,017 t (2,969 long tons)	2 shafts, 2 reciprocating engines, 21.5 knots (39.8 km/h; 24.7 mph)	1899	14 September 1901	Scrapped, 1930
Ariadne	10 × 10.5 cm SK L/40 guns	25 mm (0.98 in)	3,006 t (2,959 long tons)	2 shafts, 2 reciprocating engines, 21.5 knots (39.8 km/h; 24.7 mph)	1899	18 May 1901	Sunk, Battle of Heligoland Bight, 28 August 1914
Amazone	10 × 10.5 cm SK L/40 guns	25 mm (0.98 in)	3,082 t (3,033 long tons)	2 shafts, 2 reciprocating engines, 21.5 knots (39.8 km/h; 24.7 mph)	1899	18 May 1901	Scrapped, 1954
Medusa	10 × 10.5 cm SK L/40 guns	25 mm (0.98 in)	2,972 t (2,925 long tons)	2 shafts, 2 reciprocating engines, 21.5 knots (39.8 km/h; 24.7 mph)	1900	26 July 1901	Scrapped, 1948–1950
Frauenlob	10 × 10.5 cm SK L/40 guns	25 mm (0.98 in)	3,158 t (3,108 long tons)	2 shafts, 2 reciprocating engines, 21.5 knots (39.8 km/h; 24.7 mph)	1901	17 February 1903	Sunk, Battle of Jutland, 31 May 1916
Arcona	10 × 10.5 cm SK L/40 guns	25 mm (0.98 in)	3,180 t (3,130 long tons)	2 shafts, 2 reciprocating engines, 21.5 knots (39.8 km/h; 24.7 mph)	1901	12 May 1903	Scrapped, 1948
Undine	10 × 10.5 cm SK L/40 guns	25 mm (0.98 in)	3,112 t (3,063 long tons)	2 shafts, 2 reciprocating engines, 21.5 knots (39.8 km/h; 24.7 mph)	1901	5 January 1904	Sunk, 7 November 1915
Bremen	10 × 10.5 cm SK L/40 guns	80 mm (3.1 in)	3,797 t (3,737 long tons)	2 shafts, 2 reciprocating engines, 22 knots (41 km/h; 25 mph)	1902	19 May 1904	Sunk, 17 February 1915
Hamburg	10 × 10.5 cm SK L/40 guns	80 mm (3.1 in)	3,651 t (3,593 long tons)	2 shafts, 2 reciprocating engines, 22 knots (41 km/h; 25 mph)	1902	8 March 1904	Scrapped, 1956
Berlin	10 × 10.5 cm SK L/40 guns	80 mm (3.1 in)	3,792 t (3,732 long tons)	2 shafts, 2 reciprocating engines, 22 knots (41 km/h; 25 mph)	1902	4 April 1905	Scuttled, 1947
Lübeck	10 × 10.5 cm SK L/40 guns	80 mm (3.1 in)	3,661 t (3,603 long tons)	4 shafts, 2 steam turbines, 22.5 knots (41.7 km/h; 25.9 mph)	1903	26 April 1906	Scrapped, 1922–1923
München	10 × 10.5 cm SK L/40 guns	80 mm (3.1 in)	3,780 t (3,720 long tons)	2 shafts, 2 reciprocating engines, 22 kn	1903	10 January 1905	Scrapped, 1920
Leipzig	10 × 10.5 cm SK L/40 guns	80 mm (3.1 in)	3,756 t (3,697 long tons)	2 shafts, 2 reciprocating engines, 22 kn	1904	20 April 1906	Sunk, Battle of the Falkland Islands, 8 December 1914
Danzig	10 × 10.5 cm SK L/40 guns	80 mm (3.1 in)	3,783 t (3,723 long tons)	2 shafts, 2 reciprocating engines, 22 kn	1904	1 December 1907	Scrapped, 1922–1923
Königsberg	10 × 10.5 cm SK L/40 guns	80 mm	3,814 t (3,754 long tons)	2 shafts, 2 reciprocating engines, 23 knots (43 km/h; 26 mph)	1905	6 April 1907	Scuttled, Battle of Rufiji Delta, 11 July 1915
Nürnberg	10 × 10.5 cm SK L/40 guns	80 mm	3,902 t (3,840 long tons)	2 shafts, 2 reciprocating engines, 23 knots (43 km/h; 26 mph)	1906	10 April 1908	Sunk, Battle of the Falkland Islands, 8 December 1914
Stuttgart	10 × 10.5 cm SK L/40 guns	80 mm	4,002 t (3,939 long tons)	2 shafts, 2 reciprocating engines, 23 knots (43 km/h; 26 mph)	1905	1 February 1908	Scrapped, 1920
Stettin	10 × 10.5 cm SK L/40 guns	80 mm	3,822 t (3,762 long tons)	2 shafts, 2 steam turbines, 24 knots (44 km/h; 28 mph)	1906	29 October 1907	Scrapped, 1921–1923
Dresden	10 × 10.5 cm SK L/40 guns	80 mm	4,268 t (4,201 long tons)	2 shafts, 2 steam turbines, 24 knots (44 km/h; 28 mph)	1906	14 November 1908	Scuttled, Battle of Mas a Tierra, 14 March 1915
Emden	10 × 10.5 cm SK L/40 guns	80 mm	4,268 t (4,201 long tons)	2 shafts, 2 reciprocating engines, 23.5 knots (43.5 km/h; 27.0 mph)	1906	20 July 1909	Grounded, Battle of Cocos, 9 November 1914
Kolberg	12 × 10.5 cm SK L/45 guns	40 mm (1.6 in)	5,418 t (5,332 long tons)	4 shafts, 4 steam turbines, 25.5 knots (47.2 km/h; 29.3 mph)	1908	21 June 1910	Scrapped, 1929
Mainz	12 × 10.5 cm SK L/45 guns	40 mm (1.6 in)	4,889 t (4,812 long tons)	2 shafts, 2 steam turbines, 26 knots (48 km/h; 30 mph)	1907	1 October 1909	Sunk, Battle of Heligoland Bight, 28 August 1914
Cöln	12 × 10.5 cm SK L/45 guns	40 mm (1.6 in)	4,864 t (4,787 long tons)	4 shafts, 4 steam turbines, 25.5 knots (47.2 km/h; 29.3 mph)	1908	16 June 1911	Sunk, Battle of Heligoland Bight, 28 August 1914
Augsburg	12 × 10.5 cm SK L/45 guns	40 mm (1.6 in)	4,882 t (4,805 long tons)	4 shafts, 4 steam turbines, 25.5 knots (47.2 km/h; 29.3 mph)	1908	1 October 1910	Scrapped, 1922
Magdeburg	12 × 10.5 cm SK L/45 guns	60 mm (2.4 in)	4,570 t (4,498 long tons)	4 shafts, 4 steam turbines, 27.5 knots (50.9 km/h; 31.6 mph)	1910	20 August 1912	Grounded, 26 August 1914
Breslau	12 × 10.5 cm SK L/45 guns	60 mm (2.4 in)	4,570 t (4,498 long tons)	4 shafts, 4 steam turbines, 27.5 knots (50.9 km/h; 31.6 mph)	1910	10 May 1912	Sunk, Battle of Imbros, 20 January 1918
Strassburg	12 × 10.5 cm SK L/45 guns	60 mm (2.4 in)	4,570 t (4,498 long tons)	4 shafts, 4 steam turbines, 27.5 knots (50.9 km/h; 31.6 mph)	1910	9 October 1912	Sunk, 23 September 1944
Stralsund	12 × 10.5 cm SK L/45 guns	60 mm (2.4 in)	4,570 t (4,498 long tons)	4 shafts, 4 steam turbines, 27.5 knots (50.9 km/h; 31.6 mph)	1910	10 December 1912	Scrapped, 1935
Karlsruhe	12 × 10.5 cm SK L/45 guns	60 mm	6,191 t (6,093 long tons)	2 shafts, 2 steam turbines, 28 knots (52 km/h; 32 mph)	21 September 1911	15 January 1914	Sunk, 4 November 1914
Rostock	12 × 10.5 cm SK L/45 guns	60 mm	6,191 t (6,093 long tons)	2 shafts, 2 steam turbines, 28 knots (52 km/h; 32 mph)	1911	5 February 1914	Sunk, Battle of Jutland, 1 June 1916
Graudenz	12 × 10.5 cm SK L/45 guns	60 mm	6,382 t (6,281 long tons)	2 shafts, 2 steam turbines, 27.5 knots (50.9 km/h; 31.6 mph)	1912	10 August 1914	Scrapped, 1937
Regensburg	12 × 10.5 cm SK L/45 guns	60 mm	6,382 t (6,281 long tons)	2 shafts, 2 steam turbines, 27.5 knots (50.9 km/h; 31.6 mph)	1912	3 January 1915	Scuttled, 1944
Pillau	8 × 15 cm (5.9 in) SK L/45 guns	80 mm	5,252 t (5,169 long tons)	2 shafts, 2 steam turbines, 27.5 kn	1913	14 December 1914	Ceded to Italy, 20 July 1920
Elbing	8 × 15 cm (5.9 in) SK L/45 guns	80 mm	5,252 t (5,169 long tons)	2 shafts, 2 steam turbines, 27.5 kn	1913	4 September 1915	Scuttled, 1 June 1916
Wiesbaden	8 × 15 cm SK L/45 guns	60 mm	6,601 t (6,497 long tons)	2 shafts, 2 steam turbines, 27.5 kn	1913	23 August 1915	Sunk, 1 June 1916
Frankfurt	8 × 15 cm SK L/45 guns	60 mm	6,601 t (6,497 long tons)	2 shafts, 2 steam turbines, 27.5 kn	1913	20 August 1915	Sunk as a target, 18 July 1921
Königsberg	8 × 15 cm SK L/45 guns	60 mm	7,125 t (7,012 long tons)	2 shafts, 2 steam turbines, 28 knots (52 km/h; 32 mph)	1914	12 August 1916	Scrapped, 1936
Karlsruhe	8 × 15 cm SK L/45 guns	60 mm	7,125 t (7,012 long tons)	2 shafts, 2 steam turbines, 28 knots (52 km/h; 32 mph)	1915	15 November 1916	Scuttled, 21 June 1919
Emden	8 × 15 cm SK L/45 guns	60 mm	7,125 t (7,012 long tons)	2 shafts, 2 steam turbines, 28 knots (52 km/h; 32 mph)	1914	16 December 1916	Scrapped, 1926
Nürnberg	8 × 15 cm SK L/45 guns	60 mm	7,125 t (7,012 long tons)	2 shafts, 2 steam turbines, 28 knots (52 km/h; 32 mph)	1915	15 February 1917	Sunk as a target ship, 1922
Brummer	4 × 15 cm SK L/45 guns	15 mm (0.59 in)	5,856 t (5,764 long tons)	2 shafts, 2 steam turbines, 28 knots (52 km/h; 32 mph)	1915	2 April 1916	Scuttled, 21 June 1919
Bremse	4 × 15 cm SK L/45 guns	15 mm (0.59 in)	5,856 t (5,764 long tons)	2 shafts, 2 steam turbines, 28 knots (52 km/h; 32 mph)	1915	1 July 1916	Scuttled, 21 June 1919
Cöln	8 × 15 cm SK L/45 guns	40 mm (1.6 in)	7,486 t (7,368 long tons)	2 shafts, 2 steam turbines, 27.5 knots (50.9 km/h; 31.6 mph)	1915	17 January 1918	Scuttled, 21 June 1919
Dresden	8 × 15 cm SK L/45 guns	40 mm (1.6 in)	7,486 t (7,368 long tons)	2 shafts, 2 steam turbines, 27.5 knots (50.9 km/h; 31.6 mph)	1916	28 March 1918	Scuttled, 21 June 1919
Wiesbaden	8 × 15 cm SK L/45 guns	40 mm (1.6 in)	7,486 t (7,368 long tons)	2 shafts, 2 steam turbines, 27.5 knots (50.9 km/h; 31.6 mph)	1915	—	Scrapped, 1920
Magdeburg	8 × 15 cm SK L/45 guns	40 mm (1.6 in)	7,486 t (7,368 long tons)	2 shafts, 2 steam turbines, 27.5 knots (50.9 km/h; 31.6 mph)	1916	—	Scrapped, 1922
Leipzig	8 × 15 cm SK L/45 guns	40 mm (1.6 in)	7,486 t (7,368 long tons)	2 shafts, 2 steam turbines, 27.5 knots (50.9 km/h; 31.6 mph)	1915	—	Scrapped, 1921
Rostock	8 × 15 cm SK L/45 guns	40 mm (1.6 in)	7,486 t (7,368 long tons)	2 shafts, 2 steam turbines, 27.5 knots (50.9 km/h; 31.6 mph)	1915	—	Scrapped, 1921
Frauenlob	8 × 15 cm SK L/45 guns	40 mm (1.6 in)	7,486 t (7,368 long tons)	2 shafts, 2 steam turbines, 27.5 knots (50.9 km/h; 31.6 mph)	1915	—	Scrapped, 1921
Ersatz Cöln	8 × 15 cm SK L/45 guns	40 mm (1.6 in)	7,486 t (7,368 long tons)	2 shafts, 2 steam turbines, 27.5 knots (50.9 km/h; 31.6 mph)	1916	—	Scrapped, 1921
Ersatz Emden	8 × 15 cm SK L/45 guns	40 mm (1.6 in)	7,486 t (7,368 long tons)	2 shafts, 2 steam turbines, 27.5 knots (50.9 km/h; 31.6 mph)	1916	—	Scrapped, 1921
Ersatz Karlsruhe	8 × 15 cm SK L/45 guns	40 mm (1.6 in)	7,486 t (7,368 long tons)	2 shafts, 2 steam turbines, 27.5 knots (50.9 km/h; 31.6 mph)	1916	—	Scrapped, 1920
FK 1	5 × 15 cm SK L/45 guns	—	3,800 t (3,740 long tons)	2 shafts, 2 steam turbines, 32 knots (59 km/h; 37 mph)	—	—	Design study only
FK 1a	5 × 15 cm SK L/45 guns	—	4,850 t (4,773 long tons)	2 shafts, 2 steam turbines, 33 knots (61 km/h; 38 mph)	—	—	Design study only
FK 2	5 × 15 cm SK L/45 guns	—	5,350 t (5,266 long tons)	2 shafts, 2 steam turbines, 32 kn	—	—	Design study only
FK 3	7 × 15 cm SK L/45 guns	—	6,900 t (6,791 long tons)	2 shafts, 2 steam turbines, 32 kn	—	—	Design study only
FK 4	8 × 15 cm SK L/45 guns	—	8,650 t (8,513 long tons)	2 shafts, 2 steam turbines, 32 kn	—	—	Design study only
Emden	8 × 15 cm SK L/45 guns	40 mm	6,990 long tons (7,102 t)	2 shafts, 2 steam turbines, 29.5 knots (54.6 km/h; 33.9 mph)	8 December 1921	15 October 1925	Destroyed, 3 May 1945
Königsberg	9 × 15 cm SK C/25 guns	40 mm	7,700 long tons (7,824 t)	3 shafts, 4 steam turbines, 2 diesel engines, 32 kn	12 April 1926	17 April 1929	Sunk, 10 April 1940
Karlsruhe	9 × 15 cm SK C/25 guns	40 mm	7,700 long tons (7,824 t)	3 shafts, 4 steam turbines, 2 diesel engines, 32 kn	27 July 1926	6 November 1929	Sunk, 9 April 1940
Köln	9 × 15 cm SK C/25 guns	40 mm	7,700 long tons (7,824 t)	3 shafts, 4 steam turbines, 2 diesel engines, 32 kn	7 August 1926	15 January 1930	Sunk, 3 March 1945
Leipzig	9 × 15 cm SK C/25 guns	30 mm (1.2 in)	8,100 t (7,972 long tons)	3 shafts, 2 steam turbines, 4 diesel engines, 32 kn	28 April 1928	8 October 1931	Scuttled, July 1946
Nürnberg	9 × 15 cm SK C/25 guns	30 mm (1.2 in)	9,040 t (8,897 long tons)	3 shafts, 2 steam turbines, 4 diesel engines, 32 kn	1934	2 November 1935	Scrapped, c. 1960
M	8 × 15 cm SK C/28 guns	25 mm	8,500 t (8,366 long tons)	3 shafts, 2 steam turbines, 4 diesel engines, 35.5 knots (65.7 km/h; 40.9 mph)	1938	—	Scrapped, 1939
N	8 × 15 cm SK C/28 guns	25 mm	8,500 t (8,366 long tons)	3 shafts, 2 steam turbines, 4 diesel engines, 35.5 knots (65.7 km/h; 40.9 mph)	1938	—	Scrapped, 1939
O	8 × 15 cm SK C/28 guns	25 mm	8,500 t (8,366 long tons)	3 shafts, 2 steam turbines, 4 diesel engines, 35.5 knots (65.7 km/h; 40.9 mph)	—	—	—
P	8 × 15 cm SK C/28 guns	25 mm	8,500 t (8,366 long tons)	3 shafts, 2 steam turbines, 4 diesel engines, 35.5 knots (65.7 km/h; 40.9 mph)	—	—	—
Q	8 × 15 cm SK C/28 guns	25 mm	9,300 t (9,153 long tons)	3 shafts, 2 steam turbines, 4 diesel engines, 35.5 knots (65.7 km/h; 40.9 mph)	—	—	—
R	8 × 15 cm SK C/28 guns	25 mm	9,300 t (9,153 long tons)	3 shafts, 2 steam turbines, 4 diesel engines, 35.5 knots (65.7 km/h; 40.9 mph)	—	—	—

== Heavy cruisers ==
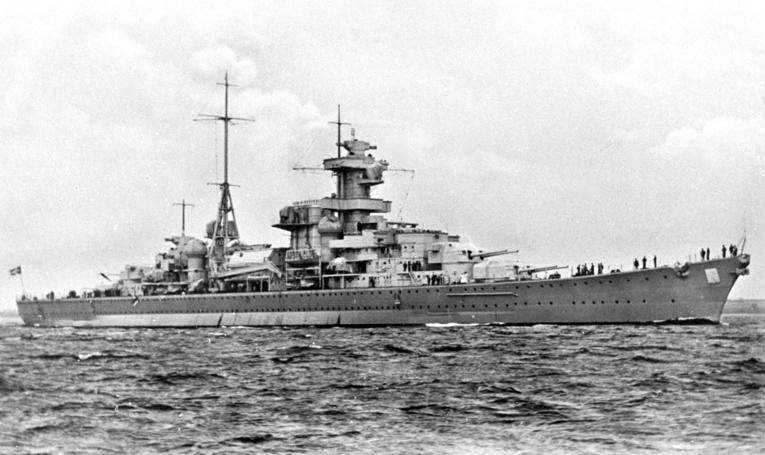
Blücher on sea trials

In addition to restricting the number of light cruisers Germany could possess, the Treaty of Versailles also limited the capital ship strength of the new Reichsmarine to six old pre-dreadnought battleships and placed restrictions on the size of replacement ships, with the intent of prohibiting ships more powerful than coastal defense ships from being built. The Reichsmarine responded by designing the Deutschland class; these heavy cruisers armed with 28 cm (11 in) guns were intended to break the naval clauses of Versailles by significantly outgunning the new treaty cruisers being built by Britain and France under the terms of the Washington Naval Treaty, which were limited to 20.3 cm (8.0 in) guns. If Britain and France agreed to abrogate the naval clauses of the Versailles treaty, Germany would abandon the new cruisers. France rejected the proposal, and so the three Deutschlands were built, and a further two of the D-class were planned, though these were cancelled in favor of a larger derivative, the Scharnhorst class of fast battleships. When Germany signed the Anglo-German Naval Agreement in 1935, the Reichsmarine was permitted to build five new heavy cruisers—the Admiral Hipper class. Plan Z, approved in early 1939, projected a dozen P-class cruisers based on the Deutschland design.

Owing to the outbreak of World War II, only three of the Admiral Hippers were completed and the P-class ships were cancelled. Admiral Graf Spee was scuttled following the Battle of the River Plate in December 1939, and Blücher was sunk during the invasion of Norway. Admiral Scheer and Admiral Hipper were destroyed by Allied bombers in the last month of the war. In 1942 the Kriegsmarine decided to convert the Admiral Hipper-class cruiser Seydlitz into an aircraft carrier, though the project was not completed. Deutschland, renamed Lützow, and Prinz Eugen both survived the war; the former was sunk in Soviet weapons tests in 1947 and the latter sank after enduring two nuclear detonations in Operation Crossroads in 1946. The two unfinished Admiral Hippers, Seydlitz and Lützow, were scrapped in the Soviet Union in the late 1950s; the former was a war prize but the latter had been sold to the Soviets before the German invasion of the Soviet Union in 1941.

Ship	Armament	Armor	Displacement	Propulsion	Service		
Ship	Armament	Armor	Displacement	Propulsion	Laid down	Commissioned	Fate
Deutschland/Lützow	6 × 28 cm SK C/28 guns	80 mm (3.1 in)	14,290 long tons (14,519 t)	2 shafts, 8 diesel engines, 28 knots (52 km/h; 32 mph)	5 February 1929	19 May 1931	Sunk in Soviet weapons test, July 1947
Admiral Scheer	6 × 28 cm SK C/28 guns	80 mm (3.1 in)	15,180 long tons (15,424 t)	2 shafts, 8 diesel engines, 28 knots (52 km/h; 32 mph)	25 June 1931	1 April 1933	Sunk on 9 April 1945, broken up for scrap
Admiral Graf Spee	6 × 28 cm SK C/28 guns	80 mm (3.1 in)	16,020 long tons (16,277 t)	2 shafts, 8 diesel engines, 28 knots (52 km/h; 32 mph)	1 October 1932	30 June 1934	Scuttled on 17 December 1939
D	6 × 28 cm guns	220 mm (8.7 in)	20,000 long tons (20,321 t) (Note: This figure is as designed; the combat displacement is unknown.)	Turbine propulsion, (Note: The details of the ships' propulsion system are unknown.) 29 knots (54 km/h; 33 mph)	14 February 1934	—	Work halted on 5 July 1934, broken up
E	6 × 28 cm guns	220 mm (8.7 in)	20,000 long tons (20,321 t)	Turbine propulsion, 29 knots (54 km/h; 33 mph)	—	—	Work not begun
P1–P12	6 × 28 cm guns	120 mm (4.7 in)	25,689 long tons (26,101 t)	12 diesel engines, 33 knots (61 km/h; 38 mph)	—	—	Canceled on 27 July 1939
Admiral Hipper	8 × 20.3 cm SK C/34 guns	80 mm (3.1 in)	18,200 long tons (18,492 t)	3 shafts, 3 turbine engines, 32 knots (59 km/h; 37 mph)	6 July 1935	29 April 1939	Scuttled 3 May 1945, broken up in 1948
Blücher	8 × 20.3 cm SK C/34 guns	80 mm (3.1 in)	18,200 long tons (18,492 t)	3 shafts, 3 turbine engines, 32 knots (59 km/h; 37 mph)	15 August 1936	20 September 1939	Sunk on 9 April 1940
Prinz Eugen	8 × 20.3 cm SK C/34 guns	80 mm (3.1 in)	18,750 long tons (19,051 t)	3 shafts, 3 turbine engines, 32 knots (59 km/h; 37 mph)	23 April 1936	1 August 1940	Sunk after US atomic tests, 22 December 1946
Seydlitz	8 × 20.3 cm SK C/34 guns	80 mm (3.1 in)	19,800 long tons (20,118 t)	3 shafts, 3 turbine engines, 32 knots (59 km/h; 37 mph)	29 December 1936	—	Ceded to the Soviet Union, broken up after 1958
Lützow	8 × 20.3 cm SK C/34 guns	80 mm (3.1 in)	19,800 long tons (20,118 t)	3 shafts, 3 turbine engines, 32 knots (59 km/h; 37 mph)	2 August 1937	—	Sold to the Soviet Union, broken up in 1958–1959 or 1960

== See also ==
- List of battleships of Germany
- List of battlecruisers of Germany
- List of ironclad warships of Germany
