= SMS Geier =

Unprotected cruiser of the German Imperial Navy

Coordinates: 34°11.218′N 76°36.127′W

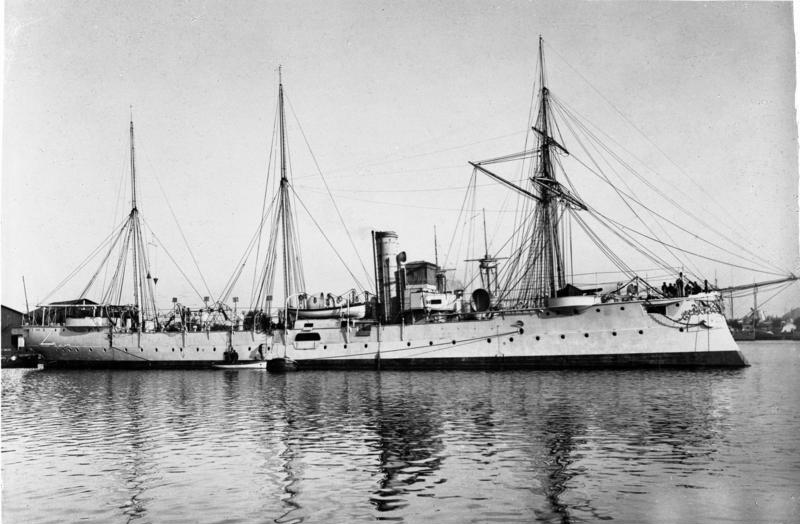
- SMS Geier, 1894

History

German Empire
- Name: Geier
- Namesake: Vulture
- Laid down: 1893
- Launched: 18 October 1894
- Commissioned: 24 October 1895
- Fate: Captured by the US Navy, 6 April 1917

United States
- Name: Schurz
- Acquired: 6 April 1917
- Commissioned: 15 September 1917
- Fate: Sunk 21 June 1918 after collision

General characteristics
- Class & type: Bussard-class cruiser
- Displacement: Normal: 1,608 t (1,583 long tons); Full load: 1,918 t (1,888 long tons)
- Length: 83.9 m (275 ft 3 in)
- Beam: 10.6 m (34 ft 9 in)
- Draft: 4.74 m (15 ft 7 in)
- Installed power: 4 × fire-tube boilers; 2,800 PS (2,800 ihp)
- Propulsion: 2 × triple-expansion steam engines; 2 × screw propellers
- Speed: 15.5 knots (28.7 km/h; 17.8 mph)
- Range: 3,610 nmi (6,690 km) at 9 knots (17 km/h)
- Complement: 9 officers; 152 enlisted men
- Armament: 8 × 10.5 cm (4.1 in) SK L/35 guns; 5 × 3.7 cm (1.5 in) Hotchkiss revolver cannon; 2 × 45 cm (17.7 in) torpedo tubes

SMS Geier ("His Majesty's Ship Vulture") (Note: "SMS" stands for "Seiner Majestät Schiff" (German: His Majesty's Ship).) was an unprotected cruiser of the Bussard class built for the German Imperial Navy (Kaiserliche Marine). She was laid down in 1893 at the Imperial Dockyard in Wilhelmshaven, launched in October 1894, and commissioned into the fleet a year later in October 1895. Designed for service in Germany's overseas colonies, the ship required the comparatively heavy armament of eight 10.5 cm (4.1 in) SK L/35 guns and a long cruising radius. She had a top speed of 15.5 kn (28.7 km/h; 17.8 mph).

Geier spent the majority of her career on foreign stations, including tours in the Americas, East Asia, and Africa. In 1897, she was deployed to the Caribbean, and during the Spanish–American War the following year, she ferried Europeans out of the war zone to Mexico by crossing the blockade lines around Cuban ports. After being transferred to the western coast of the Americas in 1899, Geier was reassigned to China to help suppress the Boxer Uprising in 1900. She remained in East Asian waters through 1905 before being recalled to Germany for major repairs. In 1911, the ship was assigned to the colony in German East Africa, though she served little time in the area, as the Italo-Turkish War of 1911–1912 and the Balkan Wars of 1912–13 required German warships in the Mediterranean to safeguard German interests. Geier returned to East Africa in early 1914, but in June that month, the new light cruiser Königsberg arrived, and Geier headed to China for second deployment there.

Geier was still en route to the German base in Qingdao when war broke out in Europe in August 1914. Slipping out of still-neutral British Singapore days before Britain declared war on Germany, she crossed the central Pacific in an attempt to link up with Maximilian von Spee's East Asia Squadron. While at sea, she captured one British freighter, but did not sink her. In need of engine repairs and coal, Geier put into the neutral United States port at Honolulu, Hawaii, in October 1914, where she was eventually interned. After the American entrance into the war in April 1917, the US Navy seized Geier, commissioned her as USS Schurz, and placed her on convoy duty. She was ultimately sunk following a collision with a freighter off the coast of North Carolina, with one man killed and twelve injured. She rests at a depth of 115 feet (35 m) and is a popular scuba diving site.

== Design ==
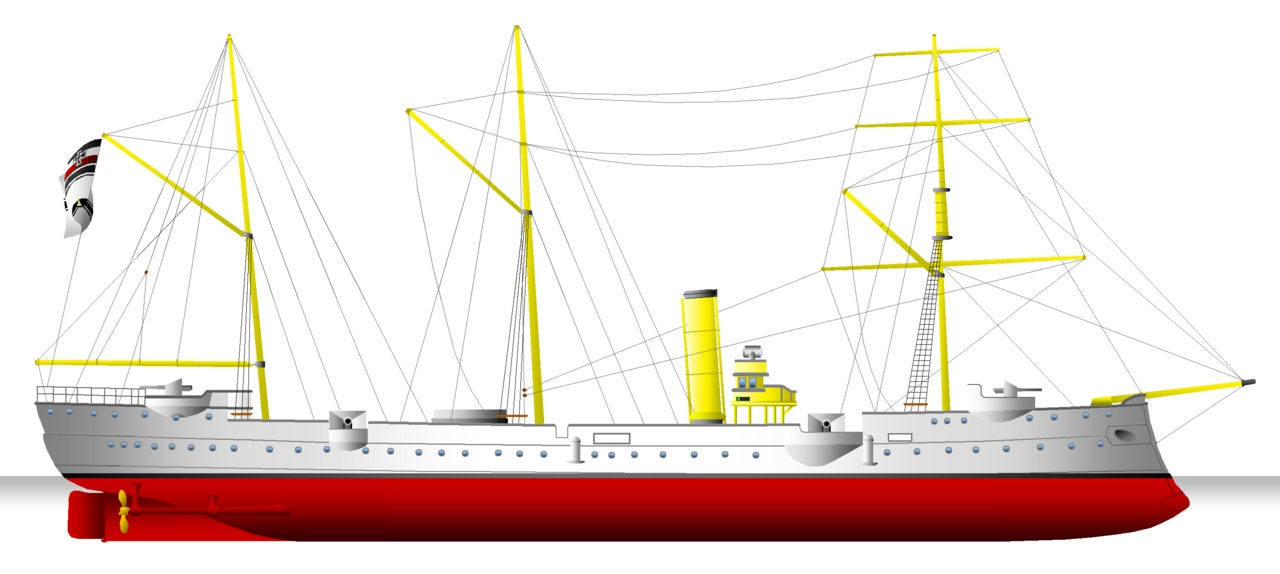
Illustration of Geier

Through the 1870s and early 1880s, Germany built two types of cruising vessels: small, fast avisos suitable for service as fleet scouts and larger, long-ranged screw corvettes capable of patrolling the German colonial empire. A pair of new cruisers was authorized under the 1886–1887 fiscal year, intended for the latter purpose. General Leo von Caprivi, the Chief of the Imperial Admiralty, sought to modernize Germany's cruiser force. The first step in the program, the two Schwalbe-class unprotected cruisers, provided the basis for the larger Bussard class.

Geier was 83.9 meters (275 ft 3 in) long overall and had a beam of 10.6 m (34 ft 9 in) and a draft of 4.74 m (15 ft 7 in) forward. She displaced 1,608 t (1,583 long tons) normally and up to 1,918 t (1,888 long tons; 2,114 short tons) at full load. Her propulsion system consisted of two horizontal 3-cylinder triple-expansion steam engines that drove a pair of screw propellers. Steam was provided by four coal-fired cylindrical fire-tube boilers that were ducted into a single funnel. These provided a top speed of 15.5 knots (28.7 km/h; 17.8 mph) from 2,800 metric horsepower (2,800 ihp), and a range of approximately 3,610 nautical miles (6,690 km; 4,150 mi) at 9 kn (17 km/h; 10 mph). She had a crew of 9 officers and 152 enlisted men.

The ship was armed with a main battery of eight 10.5 cm (4.1 in) SK L/35 quick-firing (QF) guns in single pedestal mounts, supplied with 800 rounds of ammunition in total. They had a range of 10,800 m (35,400 ft). Two guns were placed side by side forward, two on each broadside, and two side by side aft. The gun armament was rounded out by five 3.7 cm (1.5 in) Hotchkiss revolver cannon for defense against torpedo boats. She was also equipped with two 45 cm (17.7 in) torpedo tubes with five torpedoes, both of which were mounted on the deck.

== Service history ==
Illustration of Geier overseas

Geier was ordered under the contract name "F", (Note: German warships were ordered under provisional names. Additions to the fleet were given a single letter; ships intended to replace older or lost vessels were ordered as "Ersatz (name of the ship to be replaced)".) and was laid down at the Imperial Dockyard in Wilhelmshaven in 1893. She was launched on 18 October 1894, after which fitting-out work commenced. During her launching ceremony, Vizeadmiral (Vice Admiral) Victor Valois christened the ship. She was commissioned into the German Navy on 24 October 1895 for sea trials. Her trials were completed on 21 January 1896, and she was decommissioned temporarily in Kiel. During construction, her design was slightly modified based on experience from her sister ships that had already completed their sea trials. Geier's displacement was increased slightly by around 50 t (49 long tons; 55 short tons) compared to the other ships of the class and her stern was modified.

=== First deployment abroad ===
Geier was recommissioned on 1 December 1897 for her first deployment abroad, to the West Indies. Until then, Germany had relied on school ships to protect German nationals in the region. Rising tensions in Haiti prompted the Admiralstab (Admiralty Staff) to send Geier to the Caribbean, replacing the old ironclad Oldenburg that had been scheduled to deploy there. The ironclad König Wilhelm, which had recently been rebuilt into an armored cruiser, was sent to strengthen the German naval contingent. Geier departed Kiel on 9 December and arrived in Charlotte Amalie in the Danish West Indies on 3 January 1898, where she rendezvoused with the school ships Charlotte and Stein. Charlotte and Stein had already taken care of the situation in Haiti, so Geier went to Santiago de Cuba, where she stayed from 24 March to 6 April. She then received an order to visit Brazilian and Argentinian ports; stops included Pernambuco in Brazil (16–20 April) and Bahía Blanca in Argentina (23 April). While she was in the latter port, her tour of South America was cut short due to the outbreak of the Spanish–American War.

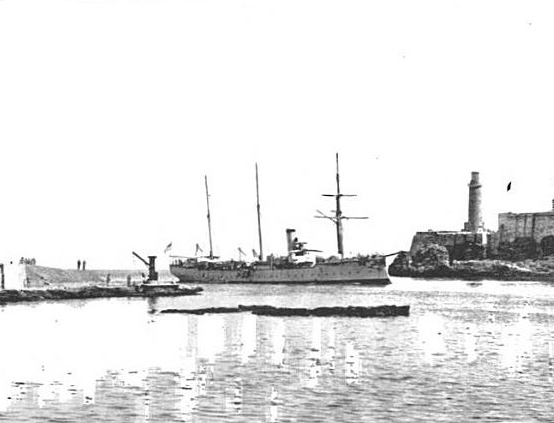
Geier in Havana in 1898

On 6 May she arrived in Saint Thomas. She thereafter made trips to Santiago de Cuba and San Juan. While in San Juan on 13–14 May, Geier witnessed an American squadron under Rear Admiral William T. Sampson bombard the city. The US government permitted Geier to cross the blockade line outside Havana to evacuate twenty civilians of various nationalities and take them to Veracruz in Mexico, arriving on the 29th. There, the governor of the city and the artillery officer from the training ship Zaragoza visited Geier for some practice torpedo launches. While Geier was in Mexico, the German ambassador invited her commander and 27 men to visit Mexico City, where they were received by President Porfirio Díaz. Geier thereafter returned to Cuba. On 16 June, the ship called on the port of Cienfuegos in Cuba. She passed through the American blockade of Santiago de Cuba twice, on 22–29 June and 1–4 August.

After the war ended, Geier visited New Orleans on 14 October, departing eleven days later for the Caribbean. She then resumed her tour of South America that had been interrupted by the war. She typically stopped in ports where significant numbers of Germans had emigrated. While in Buenos Aires, she received an order to proceed to the west coast of the continent. She transited the Straits of Magellan on 20–23 February 1899 and made stops in Valparaíso, Chile, Callao, Peru, and Panama. From 11 to 17 May, she stopped in Puerto San José, Guatemala, where she met a British cruiser; the two ships were sent there to settle financial disputes with the Guatemalan government. Geier's tour continued, with stops in Corinto, Nicaragua, Guayaquil, Ecuador, and Puntarenas, Costa Rica. While in Corinto, she received orders to proceed further north, to the western coast of the United States and Canada. She stopped in Acapulco before arriving in San Francisco on 14 August, where she underwent a boiler overhaul. On 18 September, she departed San Francisco bound for Vancouver, stopping in Esquimalt en route. On 18 October, she left Vancouver and began her return voyage south. She visited Chilean harbors in January and February 1900, including Puerto Montt on 14 February, before turning back north, as she had been assigned to the newly created West American station.

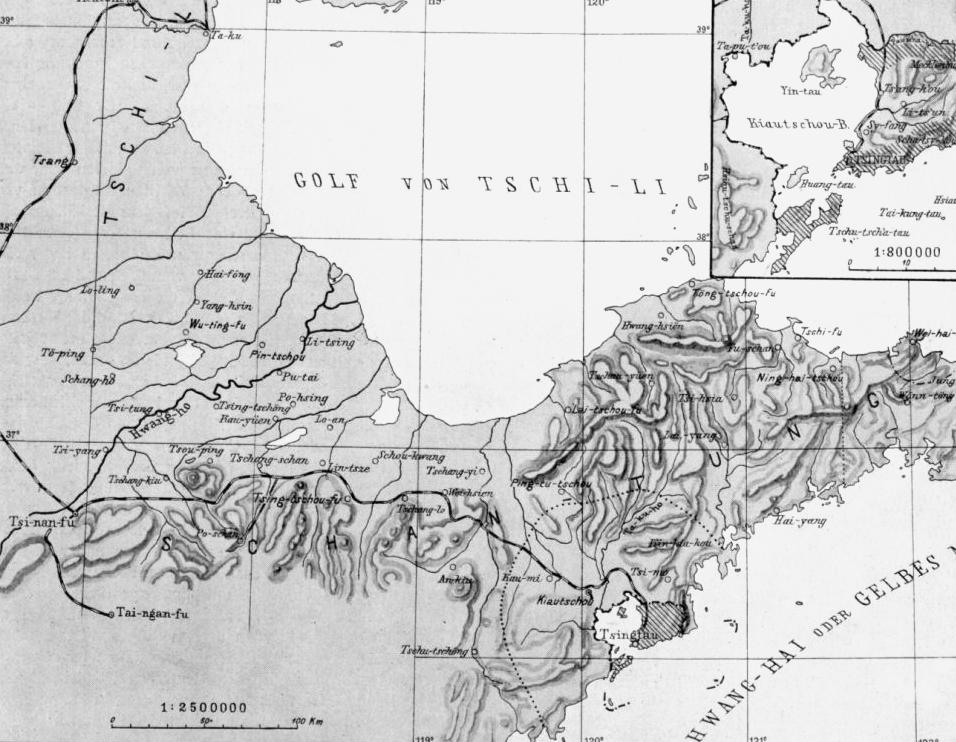
German 1912 map of the Shandong Peninsula showing the Jiaozhou Bay Leased Territory

While in Acapulco on 9 July, Geier was ordered to cross the Pacific to join the forces of the Eight Nation Alliance fighting the Boxer Uprising in Qing China. She left port on 11 July for Yokohama, Japan, by way of Honolulu, Hawaii. She arrived in Chefoo on 29 August, where she joined the ships of the East Asia Squadron. Geier first patrolled the Bohai Sea before docking in Qingdao at the German-held Jiaozhou Bay Leased Territory in October. On 28 October, she steamed to Shanghai, where she remained until February 1901. Geier then steamed up the Yangtze to Chungking, where she replaced her sister ship Bussard. On 5 April, Geier returned to Qingdao; on the 29th, she was transferred to the coast of central China, where she replaced another sister, Seeadler. Geier returned to Qingdao on 18 July, and began a tour of Korean and Japanese ports four days later with the flagship of the East Asia Squadron, Fürst Bismarck. The next twelve months were filled with cruises in the region.

On 15 October 1902, Geier began a long cruise south to the Dutch East Indies, which also included a stop in Singapore. The ship entered the dry dock in Nagasaki, Japan, for a major overhaul on 2 March 1903, which lasted until 26 April. At this time, Geier was formally assigned to the East Asia Squadron. The ship resumed its normal routine of cruises in East Asian waters with stops in various ports. In February 1904, the Russo-Japanese War broke out; from April to August, Geier was in Chemulpo, which had been captured by the Japanese. By 1905, the ship was suffering wear, having spent over seven years on foreign stations. The repair facilities in Qingdao were insufficient for the amount of work that needed to be done, and so Geier was ordered to return to Germany. She left Qingdao on 14 January and arrived in Kiel on 16 March, where she was decommissioned for a significant period of repair work. Her three-masted schooner barque rig was reduced to a two-masted topsail schooner rig.

=== Second overseas deployment ===
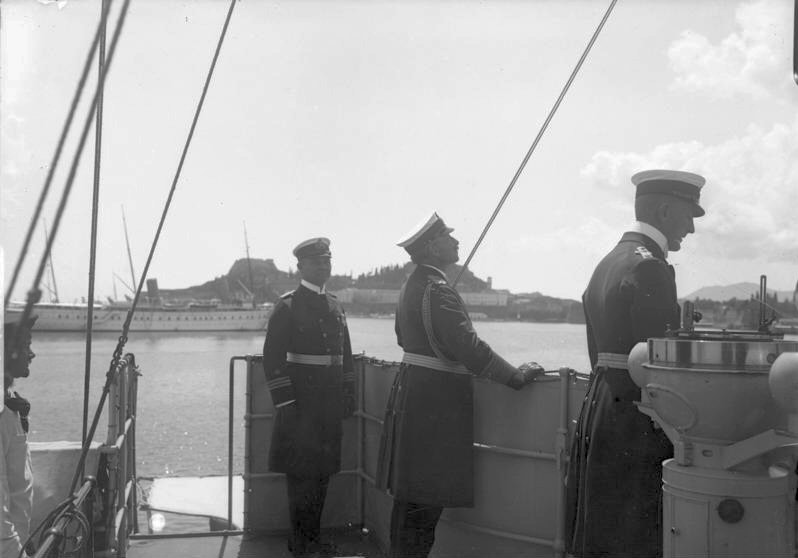
Kaiser Wilhelm (center) aboard SMS Geier

In early 1911, Geier was recommissioned to replace the unprotected cruiser Sperber on the East African Station, based in German East Africa. On 2 May she left Danzig, arriving in Kiel the following day. There, she was equipped for the deployment abroad. The ship left Kiel on 8 May and arrived in Dar es Salaam on 9 July, where she joined Seeadler. She cruised the colony's coast, but at the end of September she was ordered to the Mediterranean Sea, as the Italo-Turkish War had broken out on the 29th. At the time, the only German warship in the Mediterranean was the old gunboat Loreley, the station ship in Constantinople; this was a result of the heightened tensions in Europe following the Agadir Crisis in July, as most German warships in European waters had been recalled to Germany.

Geier's departure for the Mediterranean was delayed by a coal fire in Dar es Salaam, which required her crew to put out. She left East Africa on 2 October and arrived in Piraeus, Greece, on 16 October, where she remained until January 1912. She was then formally assigned to the Mediterranean Division, along with the recently arrived battlecruiser Goeben. From mid-April to mid-July, she made trips to provide humanitarian assistance in Libya, Palestine, and the Red Sea. These were interrupted by the arrival of Kaiser Wilhelm II's yacht Hohenzollern; the two ships cruised to the island of Corfu in early May. On 17 July, Geier went to Trieste in Austria-Hungary for an overhaul that lasted until 30 September. She thereafter went on a cruise of the eastern Mediterranean and visited several ports.

She was loading coal in Haifa on 31 January 1913 when a coal dust explosion killed two crew members. While cruising Turkish waters in August, she was ordered to replace the light cruiser Breslau in the international naval blockade of Montenegro during the Second Balkan War. She arrived off the mouth of the Bojana River in Montenegro on 11 August and patrolled it until 14 October, when she was released for a major overhaul in Triest. After repairs were completed on 4 January 1914, she was ordered to return to the East Africa Station. She arrived there on 22 February and conducted a survey of the harbor at Tanga. On 6 May, the ship was formally reclassified as a gunboat. The light cruiser Königsberg arrived on 5 June to replace Geier, which was then reassigned to the South Seas Station, where she would in turn replace her sister Condor.

=== World War I ===
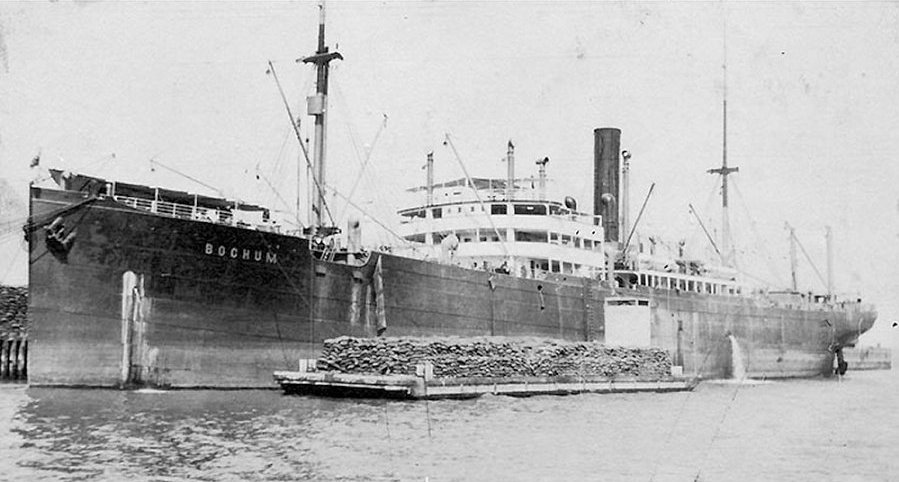
Geier's collier Bochum

Geier's captain learned of the rising tensions in Europe following the assassination of Archduke Franz Ferdinand of Austria while en route to the Pacific. The ship coaled in Singapore on 25–29 July, departing the day after Austria-Hungary declared war on Serbia. Geier thereafter proceeded southeast through the Gaspar Strait, rather than north to Qingdao, where he would be expected to go. While off Batavia on 1 August, Geier received the order from Maximilian von Spee, the commander of the East Asia Squadron, to join him at Yap. On 3. August, she received word of the German mobilization and the order to begin cruiser warfare. She coaled at Jampea from the steamer Elmshorn of the Deutsch-Australische Dampfschiffs-Gesellschaft (DADG) on 6 August before steaming north through the Buton Strait. Off Celebes she rendezvoused with the DADG steamer Bochum, which acted as her collier.

Geier's crew made temporary repairs to the ship's engines and boilers before proceeding north to the Palau Islands. Bochum took Geier under tow to conserve coal. On 20 August, she managed to contact the cruiser Emden, which was detached from the East Asia Squadron and operating as a commerce raider. Emden instructed Geier to rendezvous at the island of Angaur, but she was unable to reach the island before Emden departed. Nevertheless, the two ships met at sea the following day; one of Geier's cutters took her commander, Lieutenant Commander Curt Graßhoff, aboard Emden to meet with her captain. Emden then departed for the Molucca Strait, while Geier proceeded to Angaur. After arriving, Geier coaled from the HAPAG steamer Tsingtau. Graßhoff intended to rendezvous with the East Asia Squadron in the central Pacific, and proceeded through the Bismarck Archipelago before turning north to Kusaie. There, on 4 September, Geier captured the British freighter Southport and disabled the ship's engines before departing. The freighter's crew repaired the damage, however, and Southport made for Australia where she reported the German gunboat's presence.

On 11 September, Geier arrived in Majuro, though the East Asia Squadron had already departed the island on 30 August. By this time, the ship's engines were in such bad shape that she would have been unable to reach Qingdao, though the point was moot, as Japanese forces had already besieged the port. In addition, opportunities for commerce raiding in the area were slim, and there were no suitably fast steamers available to arm as auxiliary cruisers. Graßhoff therefore decided to follow the East Asia Squadron to South America, despite the slow speed of his ship, which was reduced to 8 knots (15 km/h; 9.2 mph). The Norddeutscher Lloyd (NDL) steamer Locksun towed Geier to the Marshall Islands, where further repairs were made from 17 to 20 September. By this time, the ship's coal and water supplies were so low that the ship would not be able to continue past Hawaii. She arrived in Honolulu on 15 October, where the then-neutral Americans requested that Geier be interned. Two Japanese ships—the battleship Hizen and the armored cruiser Asama—had been patrolling in the area. Upon learning of the arrival of Geier, the two ships remained just outside the three mile limit to await Geier's departure. Graßhoff was able to delay the internment request until 7 November owing to damage to the ship and poor weather. The following day, the US Navy interned Geier. (Note: According to the terms of Treaty XIII of the 1907 Hague Convention, warships would normally be interned after spending 24 hours in a neutral port. They could remain in the port longer than 24 hours "on account of damage or stress of weather". See: Hague XIII, Articles 12 and 14.)

=== Service as USS Schurz ===
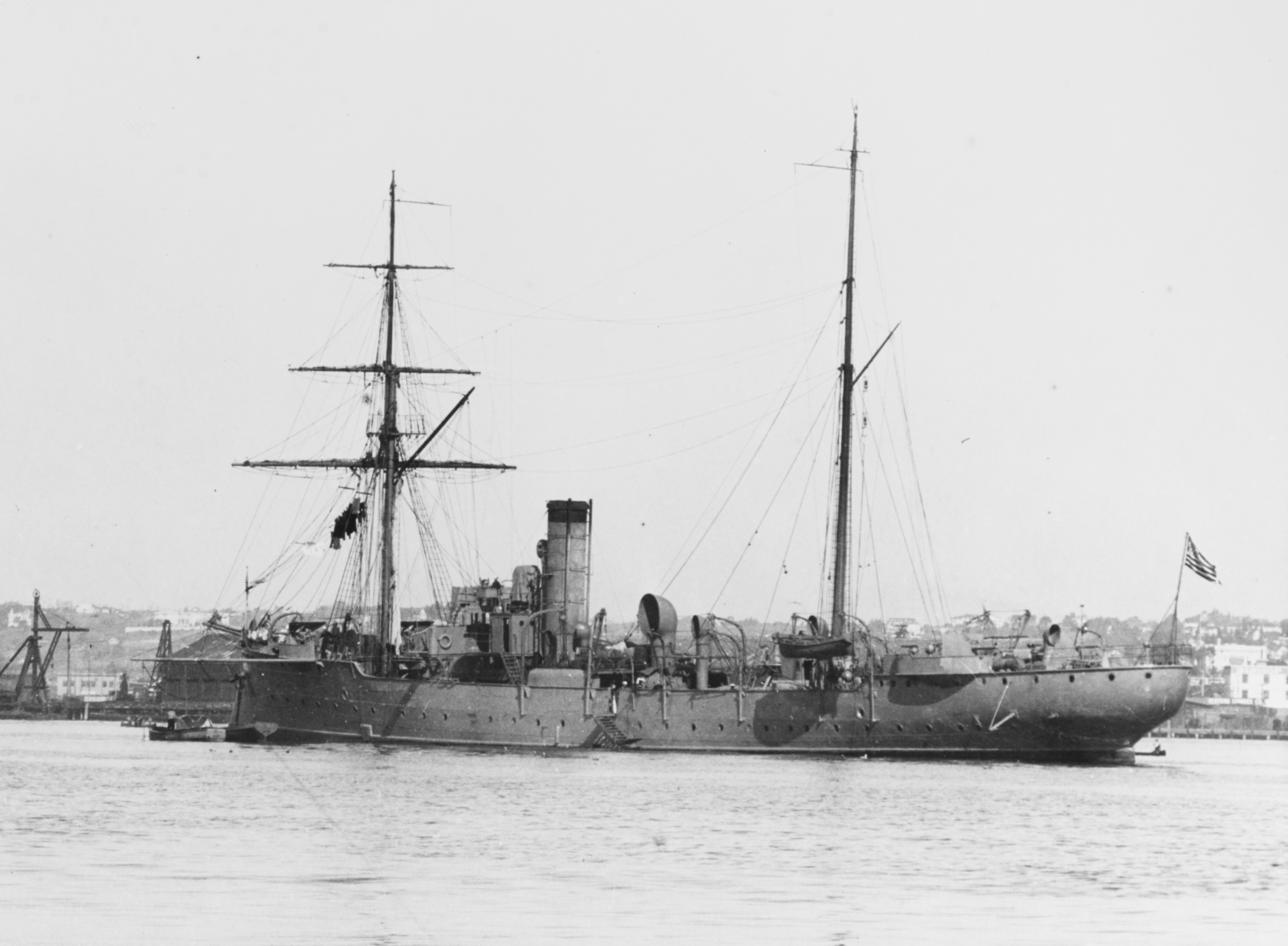
Schurz in San Diego

The United States entered the war on the side of the Allies on 6 April 1917. The US Navy seized Geier and refitted her for service in the Navy as a gunboat. The ship was renamed USS Schurz on 9 June (for German-American general and statesman Carl Schurz), and commissioned on 15 September 1917, under the command of Commander Arthur Crenshaw. Schurz departed Pearl Harbor on 31 October and escorted Submarine Division 3 to San Diego. Arriving on 12 November, she continued on with the submarines K-3, K-4, K-7, and K-8, in early December. At the end of the month, the convoy transited the Panama Canal and proceeded to Honduras. On 4 January 1918, Schurz was relieved of escort duty. She carried the American consul from Puerto Cortes to Omao and back, after which she sailed for Key West. From Florida, she was transferred to New Orleans and then sailed for Charleston, South Carolina on 1 February where she entered dry dock for periodic maintenance.

Assigned to the American Patrol Detachment, Schurz departed Charleston toward the end of April and, for the next two months, conducted patrols and performed escort duty and towing missions along the east coast and in the Caribbean. On 19 June, she departed New York for Key West. At 04:44 on the 21st, southwest of Cape Lookout lightship, she was rammed by the merchant ship Florida. The ship hit Schurz on the starboard side, crumpling that wing of the bridge, penetrating the well and berth deck about 12 feet, and cutting through bunker no. 3 to the forward fire room. One of Schurz's crewmen was killed instantly; twelve others were injured. Schurz was abandoned and sank three hours later. The ship was struck from the Navy list on 26 August 1918.

== Wreck ==
The wreckage rests at a depth of 115 feet (35 m) with the top of the wreck situated at 95 feet (29 m). In 2000, the ship was the subject of a Phase II archaeological investigation headed by East Carolina University. The wreck is protected by sovereign immunity and it is therefore illegal to recover artifacts from the site without permission. In 2013, Scuba Diving magazine named USS Schurz as one of the top ten wreck dives in North Carolina.
