= SMS Schwalbe (1887) =

Unprotected cruiser of the German Imperial Navy

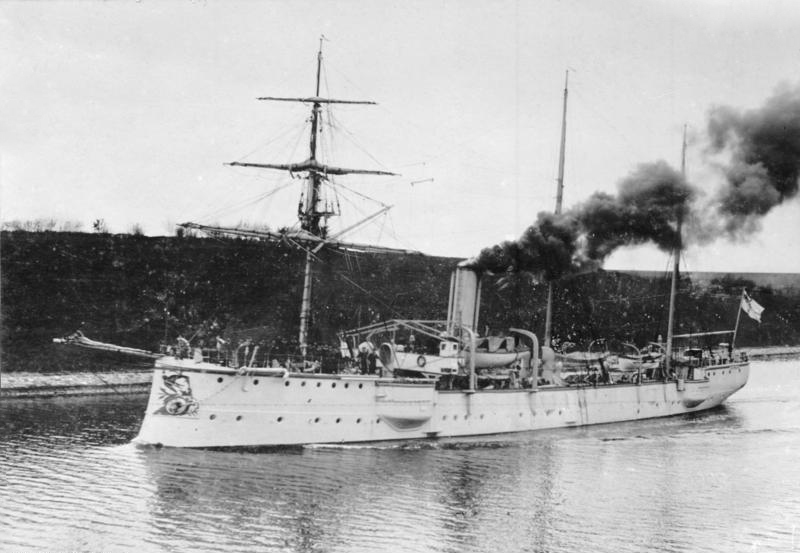
- Schwalbe in the Kaiser Wilhelm Canal

History

German Empire
- Name: Schwalbe
- Builder: Kaiserliche Werft, Wilhelmshaven
- Laid down: April 1886
- Launched: 16 August 1887
- Commissioned: 8 May 1888
- In service: 12 November 1888
- Stricken: 6 December 1919
- Fate: Scrapped, 1922

General characteristics
- Class & type: Schwalbe-class cruiser
- Displacement: Normal:1,111 t (1,093 long tons); Full load: 1,359 t (1,338 long tons)
- Length: 66.9 m (219 ft 6 in)
- Beam: 9.36 m (30 ft 9 in)
- Draft: 4.4 m (14 ft 5 in)
- Installed power: 4 × fire-tube boilers; 1,500 PS (1,500 ihp)
- Propulsion: 2 × double-expansion steam engines; 2 × screw propellers
- Speed: 13.5 knots (25.0 km/h; 15.5 mph)
- Range: 3,290 nmi (6,090 km; 3,790 mi) at 10 knots (19 km/h; 12 mph)
- Complement: 9 officers; 108 enlisted men
- Armament: 8 × 10.5 cm (4.1 in) K L/35 guns; 5 × 37 mm (1.5 in) Hotchkiss revolver cannon

SMS Schwalbe ("His Majesty's Ship Schwalbe—Swallow") (Note: "SMS" stands for "Seiner Majestät Schiff" (German: His Majesty's Ship).) was an unprotected cruiser built for the German Kaiserliche Marine (Imperial Navy), the lead ship of the Schwalbe class. She had one sister ship, Sperber. Schwalbe was built at the Kaiserliche Werft (Imperial Dockyard) in Wilhelmshaven; her keel was laid down in April 1886 and her completed hull was launched in August 1887. She was commissioned for service in May 1888. Designed for colonial service, Schwalbe was armed with a main battery of eight 10.5-centimeter (4.1 in) guns and had a cruising radius of over 3,000 nautical miles (5,600 km; 3,500 mi); she also had an auxiliary sailing rig to supplement her steam engines.

Schwalbe spent the majority of her career overseas. She served in German East Africa from 1889 to 1893, and during this period she assisted in the suppression of the Abushiri Revolt. In 1893, she returned to Germany for a major overhaul. She was decommissioned until 1898, when she returned to service for another tour abroad. She initially returned to German East Africa, where she patrolled South African waters to protect German shipping during the Second Boer War. The outbreak of the Boxer Uprising in China in 1900 prompted the Kaiserliche Marine to send Schwalbe to join the European forces battling the Boxers. Schwalbe spent 1901 and 1902 in Chinese waters, blockading the mouth of the Yangtze and suppressing local unrest. The ship returned to Germany in 1903 for another major overhaul and another stint in reserve. She ended her career as a barracks ship during World War I, and as a target ship in 1918. She was ultimately broken up for scrap in 1922.

== Design ==
Through the 1870s and early 1880s, Germany built two types of cruising vessels: small, fast avisos suitable for service as fleet scouts and larger, long-ranged screw corvettes capable of patrolling the German colonial empire. A pair of new cruisers was authorized under the 1886–1887 fiscal year, intended for the latter purpose. General Leo von Caprivi, the Chief of the Imperial Admiralty, sought to modernize Germany's cruiser force. The Schwalbes were the first modern unprotected cruiser to be built for the Kaiserliche Marine (Imperial Navy), marking the first step in Caprivi's plans.

Schwalbe was 66.9 meters (219 ft) long overall and had a beam of 9.36 m (30.7 ft) and a draft of 4.4 m (14 ft) forward. She displaced 1,111 t (1,093 long tons) normally and up to 1,359 t (1,338 long tons) at full load. Her propulsion system consisted of two horizontal 2-cylinder double-expansion steam engines powered by four coal-fired cylindrical fire-tube boilers. These provided a top speed of 13.5 knots (25.0 km/h; 15.5 mph) and a range of approximately 3,290 nautical miles (6,090 km; 3,790 mi) at 10 knots (19 km/h; 12 mph). To supplement the steam engines, she was fitted with a barquentine rig. Schwalbe had a crew of 9 officers and 108 enlisted men.

The ship was armed with a main battery of eight 10.5 cm (4.1 in) K L/35 guns in single pedestal mounts, four in sponsons fore and aft to give a measure of end-on fire, and the remaining four amidships on the main deck. Four guns could fire on either broadside. The guns were supplied with 765 rounds of ammunition in total. They had a range of 8,200 m (9,000 yd). The gun armament was rounded out by five 37 mm (1.5 in) Hotchkiss revolver cannon for defense against torpedo boats.

== Service history ==
The keel for Schwalbe was laid down at the Kaiserliche Werft (Imperial Dockyard) in Wilhelmshaven in April 1886 under the provisional name "A". (Note: German warships were ordered under provisional names. Additions to the fleet were given a single letter; ships intended to replace older or lost vessels were ordered as "Ersatz (name of the ship to be replaced)".) Her completed hull was launched on 16 August 1887; then-Konteradmiral (Rear Admiral) Alexander von Monts gave the launching speech. She was commissioned for sea trials on 8 May 1888, and they lasted until 8 August. Schwalbe was formally placed into service on 12 November and assigned to the East Africa Station in German East Africa. The assignment came following requests for reinforcement from Konteradmiral Karl August Deinhard, the local commander of naval forces in the region, to help suppress the Abushiri Revolt. She departed Germany eight days later and arrived in Zanzibar on 31 December, and was joined by the aviso Pfeil. The two ships reinforced the old sail corvettes Leipzig and Sophie.

=== First deployment to East Africa ===
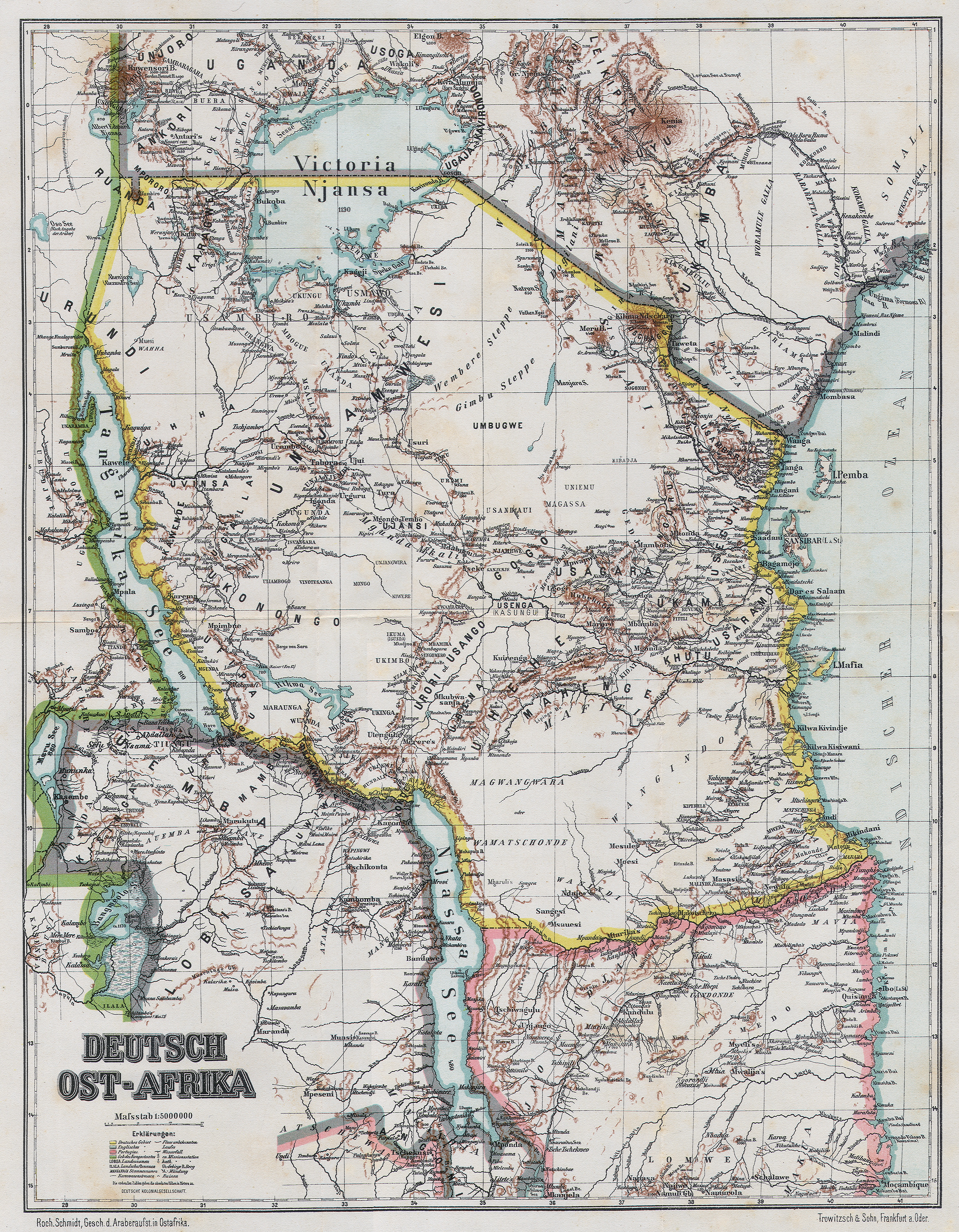
Contemporary map of German East Africa

On 3 January 1889, Schwalbe bombarded rebel positions at Bagamoyo before taking Deinhard aboard to Dar es Salaam. The next day, she ran aground on the reef surrounding Fungu Yasini Island. The ship remained stranded for two days before Leipzig and the British steamer SS Woodcock arrived to pull her free. She thereafter took her place in a blockade line to prevent contraband from reaching the rebels; Schwalbe patrolled the line from Kiswere to Ras Kimbiji. On 1 March, she was moved to the area between Kilwa Kisiwani and Mafia Island. Schwalbe, Leipzig, and the corvette Carola sent a contingent of naval infantry ashore at Kunduchi to attack rebel forces there; the three warships also provided artillery support to the landing force. Korvettenkapitän (KK–Corvette Captain) Hirschberg, Schwalbe's captain, commanded the operation. Schwalbe returned to Bagamoyo on 8 May to launch another attack; further engagements took place at Saadani on 6 June and at Pangani on 8 July. Schwalbe and her crew were given a respite from the conflict from 20 July to 17 August for a period of rest and refit at Port Louis in Mauritius.

On 29 August, Schwalbe returned to the blockade line off German East Africa. During this period, she frequently carried Deinhard on special trips. Between 7 and 10 October, she carried the station commander to survey the colony's northern border with British Kenya in company with the British gunboat HMS Mariner. Schwalbe continued to operate against insurgent forces, particularly to support Reichskommissar (Imperial Commissioner) Hermann Wissmann's forces. At the end of October, Schwalbe was joined by her sister ship Sperber. In early December, Schwalbe and Sperber were present at ceremonial reception of the Emin Pasha Relief Expedition at Bagamoyo. Both ships were also involved with settling the border of Wituland on 27–29 December. In mid-January 1890, Pfeil, Leipzig, and Sophie left East Africa, leaving Schwalbe, Sperber, and Carola on the station. Schwalbe went to Cape Town in South Africa for an overhaul that lasted from 3 March until mid-April.

Following her return from Cape Town, Schwalbe returned to supporting operations to pacify the coastal area in southern German East Africa carried out by Wissmann. During this period, several artillery pieces were captured, one of which was taken aboard Schwalbe before eventually being given to the Training Inspection for the colonial troops. By mid-May, the uprising had finally been suppressed. Schwalbe thereafter conducted the normal peacetime routine of cruising the coast to show the German flag. Hirschberg contracted malaria and became severely ill, prompting his return to Germany on 24 June to recover; KK Rüdiger arrived on 13 July to take over command of the ship. On 9 October, Rüdiger presided over a ceremony to dedicate a memorial in Tanga to the naval personnel who had been killed in the Abushiri revolt. Meanwhile, on 1 July, Wituland had been ceded to Britain as part of the Heligoland–Zanzibar Treaty; this development upset the Sultan of Wituland, who ordered the killing of several Europeans in the colony, mostly Germans. The British launched a punitive expedition, and Schwalbe remained in the area as an observer until the end of October.

In June 1891, Schwalbe went to Mahé in the Seychelles to rest her crew. Rüdiger was promoted to the position of Deputy Governor of the colony in October, and KK Oelrichs replaced him aboard the ship. Schwalbe then departed to visit Bombay, returning to German East Africa on 27 January 1892. Unrest in Moshi required Schwalbe's presence to provide support for the Schutztruppen. She was anchored off Tanga by June, and in October, the death of Ali bin Said, the Sultan of Zanzibar, caused a succession crisis that forced Schwalbe and other vessels to steam to the island to help mediate the disputes. By January 1893, Schwalbe was free to return to Bombay for repairs. In May, Schwalbe received the order to return to Germany. She arrived in Kiel on 6 August, and was decommissioned on 25 August. The Kaiserliche Werft in Kiel took the ship into drydock for an extensive overhaul and modernization. She remained out of service after the repair work was completed, until 1 April 1898, when she was recommissioned for another tour in German East Africa, to replace the cruiser Seeadler.

=== Second deployment overseas ===
On 20 April, Schwalbe left Germany and arrived off Zanzibar a month and a half later, on 7 June. She went to Cape Town for periodic maintenance from 10 October to mid-November. In January 1899, she towed the disabled German East-Africa Line steamer SS Setos to Dar es Salaam. For this, the Line donated a sum to the Navy, which the Reichsmarineamt (Imperial Navy Office) used to improve the sailors' barracks. In October, the Second Boer War broke out between British South Africa and the Boer Orange Free State and the Transvaal. Schwalbe and the cruiser Condor were sent to South Africa to protect German shipping, since the British had begun aggressively searching foreign freighters to prevent contraband from reaching the Boers. Despite the presence of the two cruisers, several German ships, including the Imperial post steamers SS Bundesrat and SS General, the freighter SS Hans Wagner, and the barque Marie were seized by the Royal Navy. This caused a major diplomatic incident and led to the passage of the Second Naval Law in Germany. During her patrol of South African waters, she stopped in Durban from 19 to 21 January 1900, Port Elizabeth, East London, Cape Town, and Delagoa Bay. Tensions eased as the Boers began to suffer several defeats in early 1900, and on 7 May, Schwalbe was back in Dar es Salaam. From here, she was ordered to leave for East Asian waters to reinforce the German East Asia Squadron and assist with suppressing the Boxer Uprising in China.

She arrived in Chinese waters in late September, and was assigned to the blockade of the mouth of the Yangtze. She spent the period from 14 February to 3 March 1901 in the German concession at Qingdao, after which she returned to the Yangtze. The blockade of the river ended in June, and on 10 June she returned to Qingdao. From 4 September to 11 November, she underwent an overhaul in Shanghai. She then returned to Qingdao and the Yangtze area, before riots in Zhejiang province forced her to steam to Ningbo to assist in suppressing the unrest on 9 April 1902. On 16 April, she left for repairs at Shanghai. On 23 July, while Schwalbe was moored in Qingdao, she received the order to return to Germany. On 16 August, she departed Qingdao and arrived in Danzig on 10 December. There, she was decommissioned a second time three days later. Another lengthy overhaul followed, which lasted from 1903 to 1905 at the Kaiserliche Werft in Danzig.

=== Later career ===
Schwalbe remained in reserve following the completion of her overhaul in 1905, until 26 October 1911, when she was recommissioned for use as a special-purpose ship. The Navy planned to convert her into a survey ship for use abroad, but in 1912 the Navy instead decided to use her to replace the old aviso Grille as a training ship. After the outbreak of World War I in August 1914, she was converted into a barracks ship based in Kiel. She served in this capacity until 1918, when she was used as a target ship outside Kiel. She was stricken from the naval register on 6 December 1919 and sold for scrapping on 7 August 1920. Schwalbe was ultimately broken up for scrap in 1922 in Hamburg.
