= SMS Sperber (1888) =

Unprotected cruiser of the German Imperial Navy

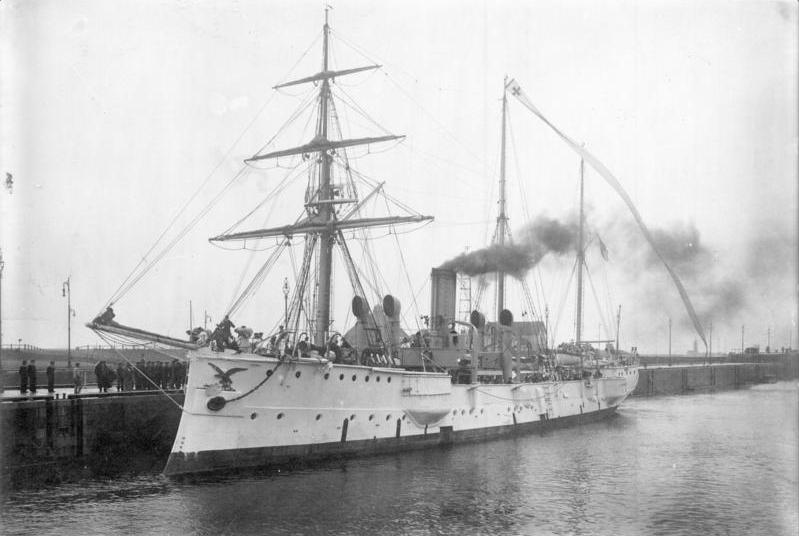
- Sperber in port

History

German Empire
- Name: Sperber
- Builder: Kaiserliche Werft, Danzig
- Laid down: September 1887
- Launched: 23 August 1888
- Commissioned: 2 April 1889
- Decommissioned: 6 July 1911
- Stricken: 16 March 1912
- Fate: Scrapped, 1922

General characteristics
- Class & type: Schwalbe-class cruiser
- Displacement: Normal:1,111 t (1,093 long tons); Full load: 1,359 t (1,338 long tons)
- Length: 66.9 m (219 ft 6 in)
- Beam: 9.36 m (30 ft 9 in)
- Draft: 4.4 m (14 ft 5 in)
- Installed power: 4 × fire-tube boilers; 1,500 PS (1,500 ihp)
- Propulsion: 2 × double-expansion steam engines; 2 × screw propellers
- Speed: 13.5 knots (25.0 km/h; 15.5 mph)
- Range: 3,290 nmi (6,090 km; 3,790 mi) at 10 knots (19 km/h; 12 mph)
- Complement: 9 officers; 108 enlisted men
- Armament: 8 × 10.5 cm (4.1 in) K L/35 guns; 5 × 37 mm (1.5 in) Hotchkiss revolver cannon

SMS Sperber ("His Majesty's Ship Sperber—Sparrowhawk") (Note: "SMS" stands for "Seiner Majestät Schiff" (German: His Majesty's Ship).) was an unprotected cruiser built for the German Kaiserliche Marine (Imperial Navy), the second member of the Schwalbe class. She had one sister ship, Schwalbe. Sperber was built at the Kaiserliche Werft (Imperial Dockyard) in Danzig; her keel was laid down in September 1887 and her completed hull was launched in August 1888. She was commissioned for service in April 1889. Designed for colonial service, Sperber was armed with a main battery of eight 10.5-centimeter (4.1 in) guns and had a cruising radius of over 3,000 nautical miles (5,600 km; 3,500 mi); she also had an auxiliary sailing rig to supplement her steam engines.

Sperber spent the majority of her career overseas. She briefly served in German East Africa in late 1889 and early 1890, before being transferred to the South Seas Station in German New Guinea. She remained there for three years before being transferred to German Southwest Africa from early 1894 to late 1896. She was decommissioned in Germany in December 1896 and overhauled before recommissioning for another tour abroad in December 1902. She briefly spent time in the East-American Station off Venezuela in early 1903 and East Africa from July to October of that year, before being assigned to the East Asia Squadron by the end of the year. After spending 1904 in Chinese waters, Sperber was reassigned to Southwest Africa, where she remained until 1911. She returned to Germany at the end of the year and was decommissioned a second time, but was thereafter used as a target ship until 1918. She was later sold for scrap in 1920 and broken up in Hamburg.

== Design ==
Through the 1870s and early 1880s, Germany built two types of cruising vessels: small, fast avisos suitable for service as fleet scouts and larger, long-ranged screw corvettes capable of patrolling the German colonial empire. A pair of new cruisers was authorized under the 1886–1887 fiscal year, intended for the latter purpose. General Leo von Caprivi, the Chief of the Imperial Admiralty, sought to modernize Germany's cruiser force. The Schwalbes were the first modern unprotected cruiser to be built for the Kaiserliche Marine (Imperial Navy), marking the first step in Caprivi's plans.

Sperber was 66.9 meters (219 ft) long overall and had a beam of 9.36 m (30.7 ft) and a draft of 4.4 m (14 ft) forward. She displaced 1,111 t (1,093 long tons) normally and up to 1,359 t (1,338 long tons) at full load. Her propulsion system consisted of two horizontal 2-cylinder double-expansion steam engines powered by four coal-fired cylindrical fire-tube boilers. These provided a top speed of 13.5 knots (25.0 km/h; 15.5 mph) and a range of approximately 3,290 nautical miles (6,090 km; 3,790 mi) at 10 knots (19 km/h; 12 mph). To supplement the steam engines, she was fitted with a barquentine rig. Sperber had a crew of 9 officers and 108 enlisted men.

The ship was armed with a main battery of eight 10.5 cm (4.1 in) K L/35 guns in single pedestal mounts, four in sponsons fore and aft to give a measure of end-on fire, and the remaining four amidships on the main deck. Four guns could fire on either broadside. The guns were supplied with 765 rounds of ammunition in total. They had a range of 8,200 m (9,000 yd). The gun armament was rounded out by five 37 mm (1.5 in) Hotchkiss revolver cannon for defense against torpedo boats.

== Service history ==
Sperber was laid down at the Kaiserliche Werft (Imperial Shipyard) in Danzig in September 1887 under the provisional designation "B". (Note: German warships were ordered under provisional names. Additions to the fleet were given a single letter; ships intended to replace older or lost vessels were ordered as "Ersatz (name of the ship to be replaced)".) She was launched on 23 August 1888, and then-Kapitän zur See (Captain at Sea) Franz Mensing gave the launching speech. She began her sea trials on 2 April 1889, which lasted until 7 June; after completion of the trials, she was temporarily decommissioned. She was thereafter assigned to the South Seas Station in German New Guinea to replace the gunboats Adler and Eber, which had been destroyed by the 1889 Apia cyclone. On 20 August, Sperber was recommissioned for her new assignment, and she departed Kiel on 4 September, bound for the Pacific. While coaling in Aden on 13 October, the cruiser received orders to head to German East Africa, which was gripped by the Abushiri Revolt. There, she was to replace the old sail corvette Leipzig and the aviso Pfeil.

=== First deployment abroad ===
Sperber arrived in Zanzibar on 26 October; four days earlier, the protectorate of Wituland had been granted to Germany. Sperber's first assignment upon reaching East Africa was to conduct a formal survey of the border between Wituland and British Kenya. Sperber was also to conduct the formal flag raising in the new protectorate. Starting on 1 November, Sperber joined the fight against the rebels. In early December, Sperber and her sister ship Schwalbe were present at ceremonial reception of the Emin Pasha Relief Expedition at Bagamoyo. Both ships were also involved with settling the border of Wituland on 27–29 December. In mid-January 1890, Pfeil, Leipzig, and Sophie left East Africa, leaving Schwalbe, Sperber, and Carola on the station.

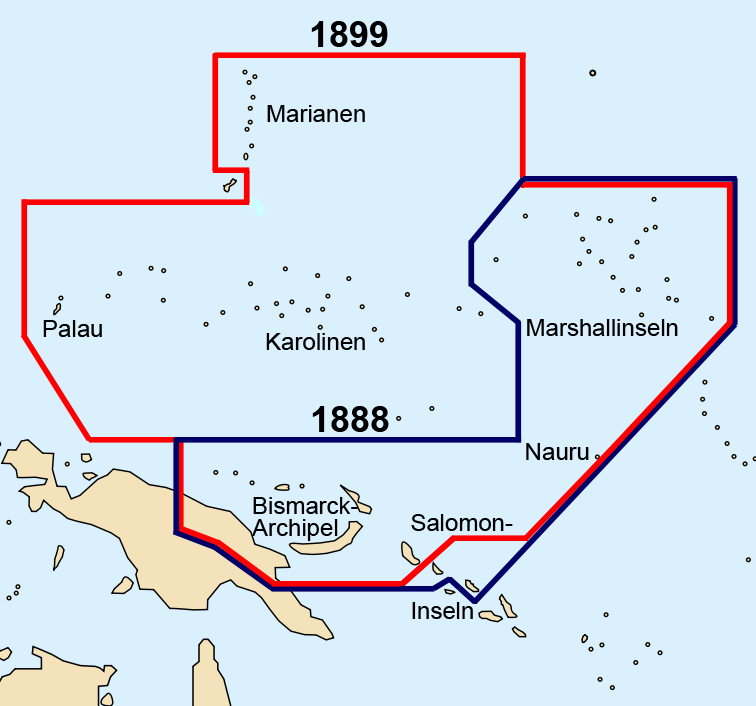
Map of German New Guinea

On 22 April, Sperber was finally released to resume her original assignment to the South Seas Station. She met Alexandrine in Australia and visited the ports of Melbourne and Sydney, where she underwent an overhaul. Sperber finally arrived in Apia in German Samoa on 30 July. She thereafter took Friedrich Biermann, the Imperial Commissioner for the Marshall Islands, on a tour of the islands. The cruiser returned to Apia on 5 October. In January 1891, Sperber's commander presided over the unveiling of a monument to the German sailors who had been killed at the Battle of Vailele in December 1888. The cruiser then departed for Sydney for another overhaul, which lasted from 24 January to 21 March. After the repair work was completed, Sperber went on a tour of Germany's colonies in the Pacific, including the Bismarck Archipelago, the Marshalls, and Butaritari. She was back in Apia by 6 June, where she remained stationed until 15 December. The new unprotected cruiser Bussard joined her there on 13 December.

In February 1892, Sperber left for another overhaul in Sydney. While en route, she had to stop at Tabiteuea in the Gilbert Islands and send a landing party ashore to punish locals who had attacked German businessmen there. The overhaul lasted from 3 March to 3 May, after which Sperber went on another tour of the islands, including the Marshalls, Butaritari, and Matupit Island. At Matupit the Deputy Chancellor, Georg Schmiele, came aboard the ship. Sperber was back in Apia by 17 May, and she remained there until 1 November, when she left for another tour, which included stops at Nukufetau, Herbertshöhe—the capital of German New Guinea—and Friedrich Wilhelmshafen. Another period of dockyard work at Sydney followed from 6 February 1893 to 18 April. In the meanwhile, unrest in Samoa broke out, under the leadership of King Mata'afa Iosefo. He was arrested, however, which caused the movement to disperse; after she returned from Sydney, Sperber was tasked with taking Mata'afa into exile on Jaluit Atoll.

The unprotected cruiser Falke, which had been assigned to German Southwest Africa, was ordered to replace Sperber in November 1893. Sperber was in turn ordered to return to Germany, and she departed the South Seas Station on 6 November. While en route, however, her orders were changed and she was instead sent to Southwest Africa. She stopped in Cape Town, South Africa for an overhaul, and finally arrived in Kamerun on 28 May 1894. Her shallower draft, compared to her predecessor Falke, permitted her to routinely cross the sandbar in the mouth of the Kamerun River. At this time, the only other German warship on the station was the gunboat Hyäne, though the government steamer Nachtigal and the hulked gunboat Cyclop were also available in the colony. Sperber was thereafter responsible for conducting patrols of the colony.

She visited Cape Town on 10 November 1895, and while on her way there, she carried a granite copy of the padrão that had been placed there by the Portuguese explorer Diogo Cão in the late 15th century. The original stone monument had been transported back to Berlin for preservation in 1893 by Falke. A short period of dockyard maintenance lasted from 17 to 29 February 1896. On 6 March, she was sent to Swakopmund in response to an uprising by the local population. She send a landing party ashore to help the Schutztruppen (Protection force) secure the city. From 23 March to 9 April, Sperber went to Mossamedes for a period of rest for her crew. On 22 September, she departed Southwest Africa and headed for Germany; she arrived in Kiel on 18 November and was decommissioned on 7 December. Starting in early 1898, Sperber was taken into drydock for a major overhaul. The work lasted until August, and she was placed back in reserve once it was completed.

=== Second deployment abroad ===
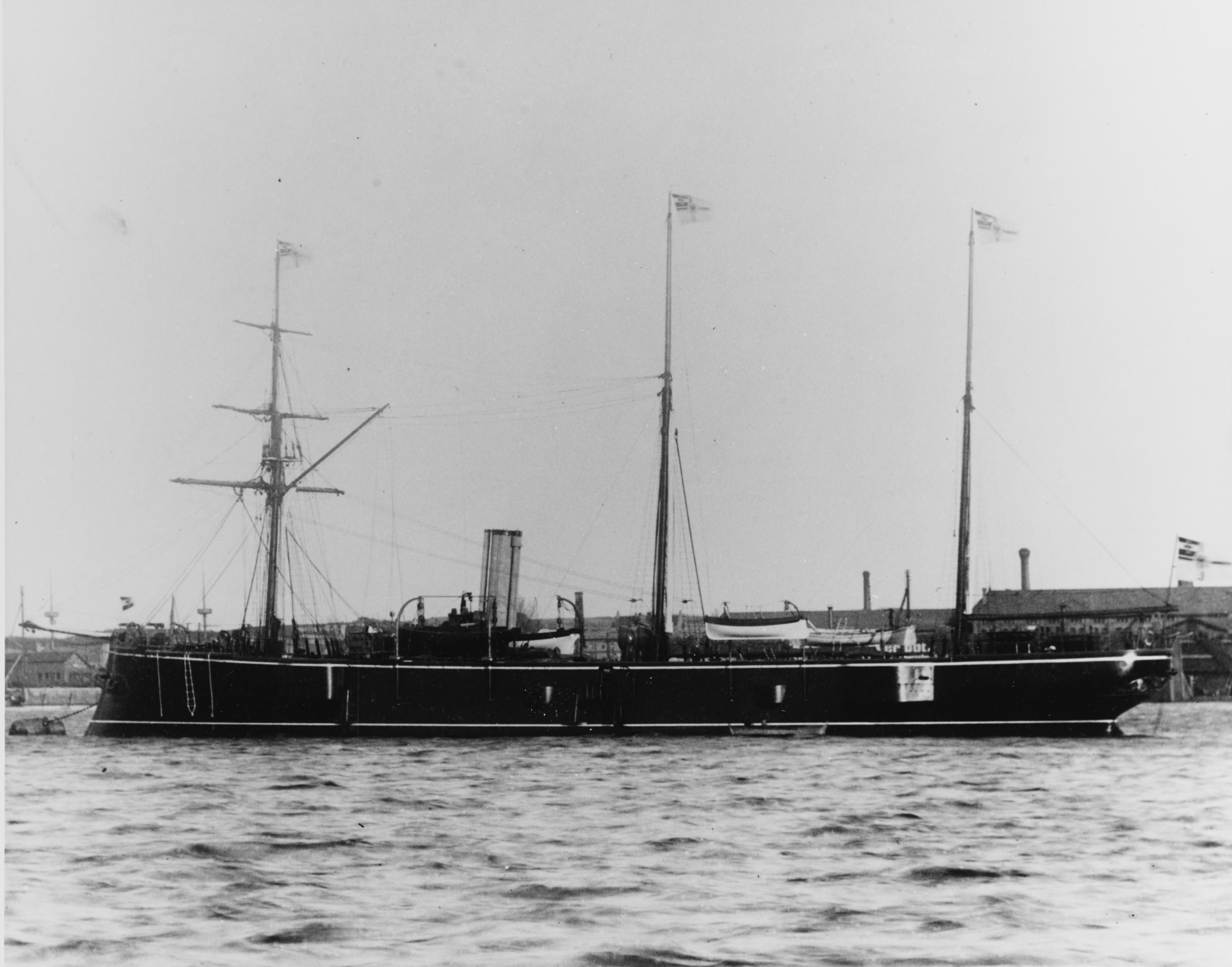
Sperber in port

On 16 December 1902, the ship was again commissioned for service abroad, this time to reinforce the East-American Station in Central and South America. She left Kiel on 5 January 1903 and arrived in Willemstad in Curaçao. The Venezuela Crisis of 1902–03 was by that time winding down, and so apart from visits to a few Venezuelan ports, her presence was unnecessary. Instead, she was ordered to German East Africa in late February. Sperber left the East-American Station on 22 March and steamed through the Mediterranean Sea, arriving in Dar es Salaam on 1 July. She was there only briefly, before she was again transferred, this time to the East Asia Squadron on 9 October. She arrived in Singapore on 23 November and continued on to the mouth of the Yangtze in China, where she was stationed at the time. From there, she went to Shanghai on 15 May 1904, and visited several Chinese ports, followed by an overhaul from August to December in Germany's concession at Qingdao. In early 1905, Sperber visited ports in southern China, where she received orders to return to Southwest Africa. She went Qingdao on 24 April before departing for Africa, arriving in Douala on 26 July. There, she met the gunboat Habicht.

On 27 January 1907, Sperber was present in Lomé for the opening of the first railroad line in German Togoland. Between 1908 and 1909, she conducted an extensive survey of the west-African coast. In February 1909, she visited the ruins of Groß Friedrichsburg, the old capital of the Brandenburger Gold Coast, a colony founded by Frederick William I of Prussia in the 17th century. She thereafter returned to survey work in Kamerun and Southwest Africa. On 6 March 1910, she was transferred to German East Africa to replace Bussard. While en route, her crew helped to put out a major fire in Lüderitz Bay on 15 April. After arriving in East Africa, Sperber conducted the normal routine of visiting ports in the colony. She went to Cape Town for an overhaul from 26 October to 3 December. On 6 March 1911, she received orders to return to Germany for a second time. She arrived in Wilhelmshaven on 29 June, and was decommissioned again on 6 July. She was stricken from the naval register on 16 March 1912 and was thereafter used as a target ship until 1918. She was sold on 7 August 1920 and broken up for scrap in Hamburg in 1922.
