= Schwalbe-class cruiser =

Unprotected cruiser class of the German Imperial Navy

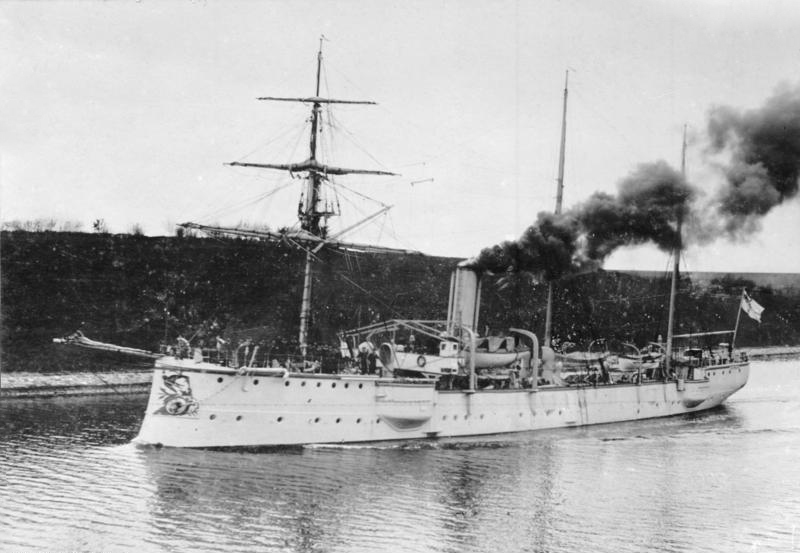
- Schwalbe in the Kaiser Wilhelm Canal

Class overview
- Preceded by: None
- Succeeded by: Bussard class
- Built: 1886–1889
- In commission: 1888–1918
- Completed: 2
- Scrapped: 2

General characteristics
- Type: Unprotected cruiser
- Displacement: Normal:1,111 t (1,093 long tons); Full load: 1,359 t (1,338 long tons)
- Length: 66.90 m (219 ft 6 in)
- Beam: 9.36 m (30 ft 9 in)
- Draft: 4.40 m (14 ft 5 in)
- Installed power: 4 × fire-tube boilers; 1,500 PS (1,500 ihp)
- Propulsion: 2 × double-expansion steam engines; 2 × screw propellers
- Speed: 13.5 knots (25.0 km/h; 15.5 mph)
- Range: 3,290 nmi (6,090 km) at 10 knots (19 km/h; 12 mph)
- Complement: 9 officers; 108 enlisted men
- Armament: 8 × 10.5 cm (4.1 in) K L/35 guns; 5 × 3.7 cm (1.5 in) Hotchkiss revolver cannon

The Schwalbe class of unprotected cruisers were the first ships of the type built for the German Kaiserliche Marine (Imperial Navy). The class comprised two ships, Schwalbe, the lead ship, and Sperber. They were designed for service in Germany's recently acquired colonial empire, and were built between 1886 and 1889. They were armed with a main battery of eight 10.5-centimeter (4.1 in) guns and could steam at a speed of 13.5 knots (25.0 km/h; 15.5 mph).

Schwalbe and Sperber spent their active careers abroad, usually in Germany's African colonies or in the Pacific. The two cruisers assisted in the suppression of the Abushiri Revolt in German East Africa in 1889–1890. By the end of the 1890s, both ships had been overhauled and decommissioned in Germany. They returned to service at the turn of the century for another tour overseas; Schwalbe joined the forces that battled the Boxer Rebellion in China in 1900 before being decommissioned a second time in 1902. Sperber remained in Africa until 1911, when she too was decommissioned. Schwalbe was used as a training ship after 1912 and Sperber was used as a target ship during World War I. Both vessels were sold in 1920 and broken up in 1922.

== Design ==
Through the 1870s and early 1880s, Germany built two types of cruising vessels: small, fast avisos suitable for service as fleet scouts and larger, long-ranged screw corvettes capable of patrolling the German colonial empire. A pair of new cruisers was authorized under the 1886–1887 fiscal year, intended for the latter purpose. In the early 1880s, the fleet's colonial cruisers consisted of a motley collection of older sailing ships that were suitable only for training purposes. General Leo von Caprivi, the Chief of the Kaiserliche Marine (Imperial Navy), sought new cruisers that would have strong fighting capabilities in addition to traditional overseas cruiser characteristics. At that time, the navy largely relied on gunboats to patrol the colonies, supported by a flying squadron of cruisers as necessary. As the overseas empire grew in size, it became increasingly untenable to rely on this structure to enforce German claims on its colonies. The two new cruisers were intended to support the colonial gunboats on a permanent basis.

The design was prepared in 1886–1887, and competing operational requirements defined their characteristics. The need to operate close to shore necessitated a relatively shallow draft. Commerce protection duties mandated an auxiliary sailing rig, while the need to conduct police actions in the colonies required a crew large enough that a landing party could be spared. The Schwalbe class was the first unprotected cruiser design built in Germany, and along with several other small warships, they permitted Caprivi to retire five old sailing frigates and modernized the German cruiser force. They were well-received by the German Navy, and they also provided the basis for the even more successful Bussard-class cruisers.

=== General characteristics ===
The ships of the Schwalbe class were 62.59 meters (205 ft 4 in) long at the waterline and 66.90 m (219 ft 6 in) long overall. They had a beam of 9.36 m (30 ft 9 in), though over the sponsons for the main guns, the beam increased to 10.10 m (33 ft 2 in). The ships had a draft of 4.4 m (14 ft 5 in) forward and 4.72 m (15 ft 6 in) aft. They displaced 1,111 metric tons (1,093 long tons) as designed and up to 1,359 t (1,338 long tons) at full load. The ships' hulls were constructed with a transverse framing composed of steel, and were covered with a layer of wood and copper sheathing to protect them from marine biofouling on extended voyages overseas. Their stem and stern were made of wood, and a bronze ram was mounted at the bow. The hull was divided into eleven watertight compartments.

Steering was controlled by a single rudder. The two cruisers were good sea boats, and were very maneuverable. They suffered from severe weather helm, and tended to roll badly in a beam sea; their metacentric height was .665 m (2 ft 2.2 in). They lost little speed in a head sea. Schwalbe and Sperber each had a crew of 9 officers and 108 enlisted men. They carried a number of small boats, including one picket boat, one cutter, one yawl, and one dinghy.

=== Propulsion ===
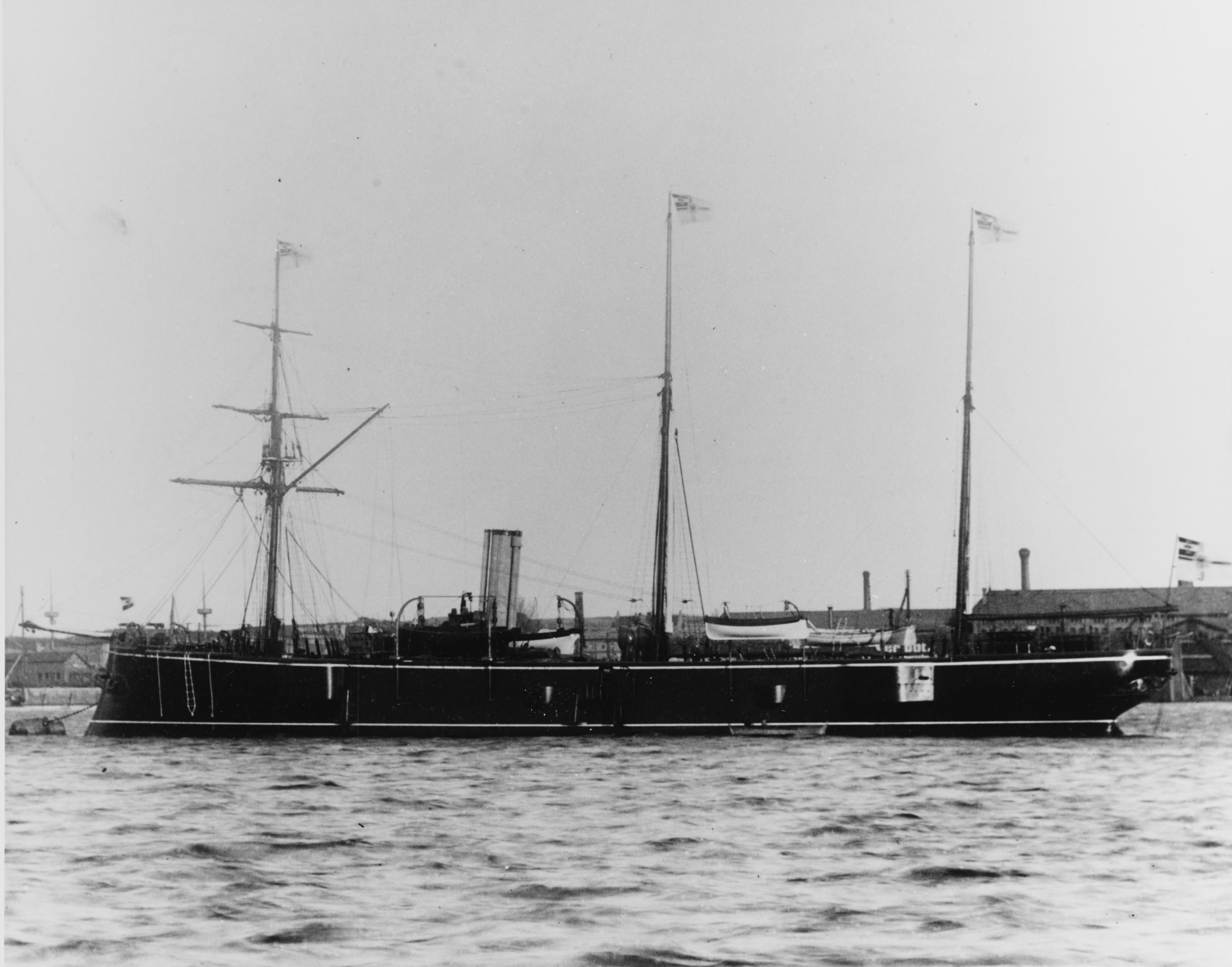
Sperber in port early in her career

Their propulsion system consisted of two horizontal 2-cylinder double-expansion steam engines, with steam provided by four coal-fired cylindrical fire-tube boilers trunked into a single funnel. The engines drove a pair of 3-bladed screw propellers that were 2.8 m (9 ft 2 in) wide in diameter. The ships' engines provided a design speed of 13.5 knots (25.0 km/h; 15.5 mph) from 1,500 metric horsepower (1,500 ihp). They had a range of approximately 3,290 nautical miles (6,090 km; 3,790 mi) at a speed of 10 knots (19 km/h; 12 mph). On trials, both ships exceeded their rated speeds, with Schwalbe reaching 14.1 knots (26.1 km/h; 16.2 mph) and Sperber making 14.3 knots (26.5 km/h; 16.5 mph), from 1,558 and 1,595 metric horsepower (1,537 and 1,573 ihp), respectively. At these speeds, the cruising radius fell to 1,630 nmi (3,020 km; 1,880 mi). To supplement the steam engines, the ships were fitted with a barquentine rig. Schwalbe was fitted with one electricity generator rated at 5 kilowatts (6.7 hp) at 67 volts during her modernization in 1903.

=== Armament ===
Since Caprivi sought overseas cruisers that would still have significant combat power, the ships were armed with a relatively heavy main battery—for ships of their size—of eight 10.5 cm (4.1 in) K L/35 guns in single pedestal mounts. Four were placed in sponsons fore and aft to give a measure of end-on fire, and the remaining four amidships on the main deck. Four guns could fire on either broadside. They were supplied with 765 rounds of ammunition in total. They had a range of 8,200 m (9,000 yd). Four of the guns were mounted in sponsons, with two side by side forward and aft. The remaining four guns were placed amidships in gun ports. Four guns were mounted on each broadside. The gun armament was rounded out by five 3.7 cm (1.5 in) Hotchkiss revolver cannon for defense against torpedo boats. The ships also carried a single torpedo tube that was carried amidships on a trainable mount, which could be fired to either side at a fixed angle.

== Ships ==
Construction data
Name	Builder	Laid down	Launched	Commissioned
Schwalbe	Kaiserliche Werft, Wilhelmshaven	1886	16 August 1887	8 May 1888
Sperber	Kaiserliche Werft, Danzig	1887	23 August 1888	2 April 1889

== Service history ==
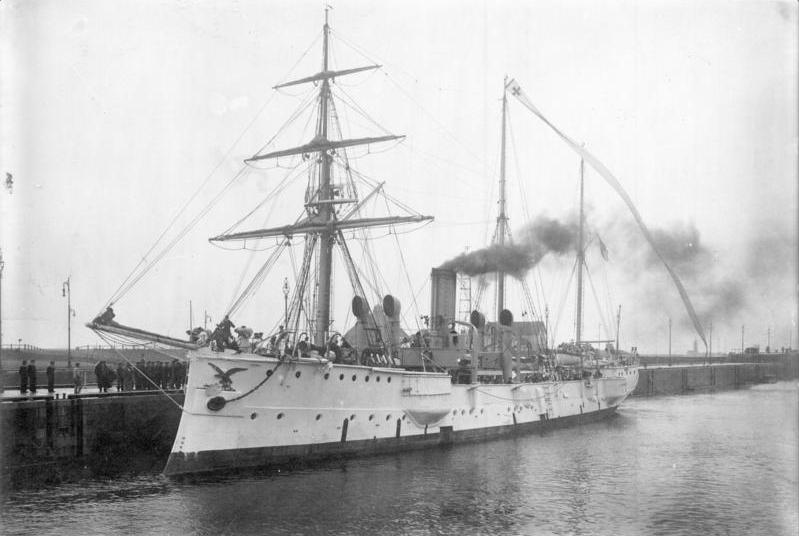
Sperber in port

Schwalbe and Sperber spent the majority of their careers on Germany's colonial stations, where they policed the colonies, suppressed unrest, and showed the flag. Both ships were initially called to German East Africa to help put down the Abushiri Revolt in 1889–1890. Schwalbe remained in the colony after the rebellion was suppressed, but Sperber left for the South Seas Station in German New Guinea. In mid-1893, Schwalbe was recalled to Germany for a major overhaul, and Sperber was similarly ordered to return at the end of the year, but while en route she was sent to German Southwest Africa instead. Sperber finally returned to Germany in late 1897 for her overhaul, which was completed the following year. Both ships were decommissioned after their overhauls were finished.

In April 1898, Schwalbe was recommissioned for another tour abroad. She first returned to German East Africa, where the Second Boer War threatened regional stability; British warships began seizing German vessels suspected of carrying contraband to the Boers. This created a major diplomatic incident and Schwalbe was sent to protect German shipping in the area. The outbreak of the Boxer Rebellion in Qing China in 1900 proved to be more pressing, and so Schwalbe was sent to join the Eight Nation Alliance that had formed to crush the Boxers. During her deployment to China, she helped blockade the Yangtze and sent landing parties ashore to control unrest in Ningbo. In mid-1902, she was recalled to Germany for a second time, was overhauled, and was again decommissioned.

Sperber meanwhile had been reactivated in December 1902 in response to the Venezuelan crisis of 1902–1903; she was sent there in January 1903, though by the time she arrived the crisis had subsided and she was no longer necessary. She was therefore transferred first to German East Africa, where she remained only briefly before being moved again, this time to the East Asia Squadron. She served in the unit from late 1903 to early 1905, when she was reassigned to German Southwest Africa. She returned to Germany in early 1911 and was decommissioned in July. In October 1911 Schwalbe was recommissioned for use as a special purposes ship. Initially, she was to be a survey ship, but the Navy instead decided to use her to replace the old aviso Grille as a training ship. Sperber was stricken from the naval register in 1912 and used as a target ship through World War I. Schwalbe continued on as a training ship during the war until 1918, when she too was employed as a gunnery training target. Both ships were sold for scrapping in August 1920 and were broken up in 1922 in Hamburg.
