= List of protected cruisers of Germany =

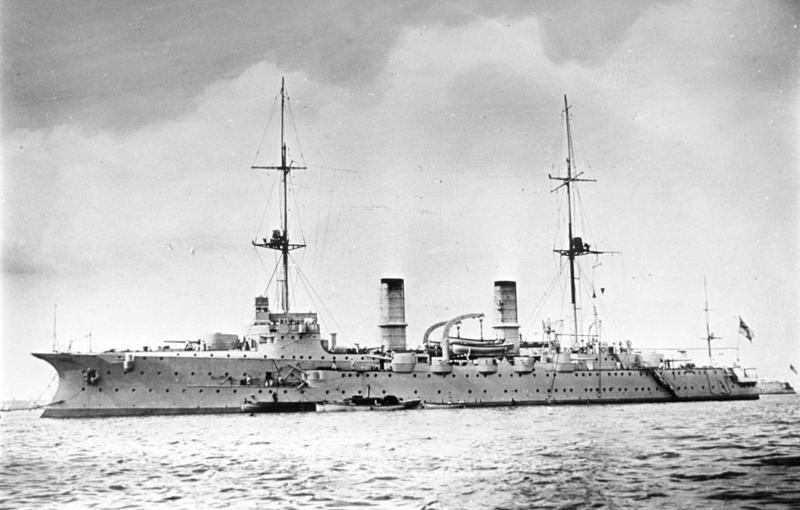
Hansa, of the Victoria Louise class

The German Imperial Navy (Kaiserliche Marine) built a series of protected cruisers in the 1880s and 1890s, starting with the two ships of the Irene class. The Navy only completed two additional classes of protected cruisers, comprising six more ships: the unique Kaiserin Augusta, and the five Victoria Louise-class ships. The type was then superseded by the armored cruiser at the turn of the century, beginning with Fürst Bismarck. Because of limited budgets in the pre-Tirpitz era, the German Navy attempted to build vessels that could serve as overseas cruisers and scouts for the fleet, though the ships were not satisfactory. The protected cruiser designs generally copied developments in foreign navies. The Victoria Louise design resembled contemporary German battleships, which favored smaller-caliber main guns and more secondary guns than on their foreign counterparts.

Most of the German protected cruisers served on overseas stations throughout their careers, primarily in the East Asia Squadron in the 1890s and 1900s. Prinzess Wilhelm participated in the seizure of the Jiaozhou Bay Leased Territory in November 1897, which was used as the primary base for the East Asia Squadron. Kaiserin Augusta, Hertha, and Hansa assisted in the suppression of the Boxer Uprising in China in 1900, and Vineta saw action during the Venezuela Crisis of 1902–1903, where she bombarded several Venezuelan fortresses. Irene, Prinzess Wilhelm, and Kaiserin Augusta were relegated to secondary duties in the 1910s, while the Victoria Louise class was used to train naval cadets in the 1900s. All eight ships were broken up for scrap in the early 1920s.

Key
Armament	The number and type of the primary armament
Armor	The thickness of the deck armor
Displacement	Ship displacement at full combat load (Note: Historian Erich Gröner states that full load was defined as "[equal to] type displacement plus full load fuel oil, diesel oil, coal, reserve boiler feed water, aircraft fuel, and special equipment." See: Gröner, p. ix.)
Propulsion	Number of shafts, type of propulsion system, and top speed generated
Service	The dates work began and finished on the ship and its ultimate fate
Laid down	The date the keel began to be assembled
Commissioned	The date the ship was commissioned

== Irene class ==
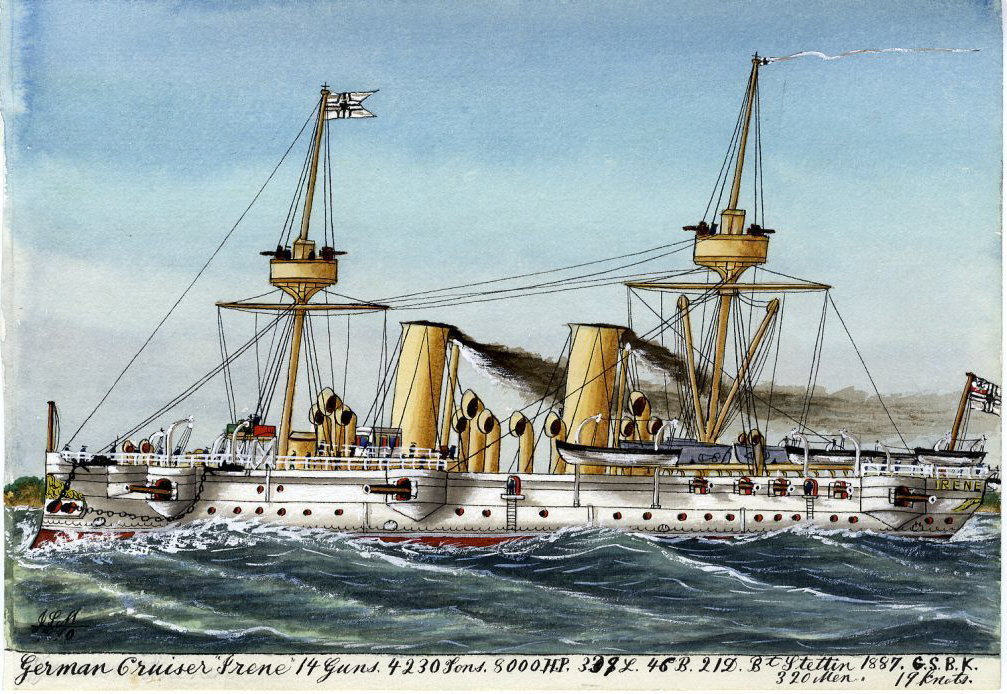
Painting of Irene in 1894

The Irene class was the first protected cruiser design built by the German Imperial Navy. Built between 1886 and 1889 at the AG Vulcan shipyard in Stettin and the Germaniawerft shipyard in Kiel, the class comprised two ships, Irene and Prinzess Wilhelm. As built, the ships were armed with a main battery of fourteen 15-centimeter (5.9 in) breech-loading guns, of which four were L/30 models and ten shorter L/22 guns. They had a top speed of 18 knots (33 km/h; 21 mph). They were modernized in 1899–1905, and their armament was upgraded with new, 10.5 cm (4.1 in) SK L/35 quick-firing guns.

Both ships served in the East Asia station with the East Asia Squadron; Prinzess Wilhelm played a major role in the seizure of the Jiaozhou Bay Leased Territory in November 1897, under command of Admiral Otto von Diederichs. The two ships were sent to safeguard German interests in the Philippines after the Battle of Manila Bay during the Spanish–American War. There, Irene's presence caused tensions with the American squadron occupying the islands. Both ships returned to Germany at the turn of the century, and remained in European waters until 1914, when they were removed from active service. They were reduced to secondary roles—Irene was used as a submarine tender and Prinzess Wilhelm was hulked—and continued to serve until the early 1920s, when they were sold for scrap.

Summary of the Irene class
Ship	Armament	Armor	Displacement	Propulsion	Service		
Ship	Armament	Armor	Displacement	Propulsion	Laid down	Commissioned	Fate
Irene	14 × 15 cm guns	20 mm (0.79 in)	5,027 t (4,948 long tons)	2 shafts, 2 double-expansion steam engines, 18 kn (33 km/h; 21 mph)	1886	25 May 1888	Scrapped, 1922
Prinzess Wilhelm	14 × 15 cm guns	20 mm (0.79 in)	5,027 t (4,948 long tons)	2 shafts, 2 double-expansion steam engines, 18 kn (33 km/h; 21 mph)	1886	13 November 1889	Scrapped, 1922

== Kaiserin Augusta ==
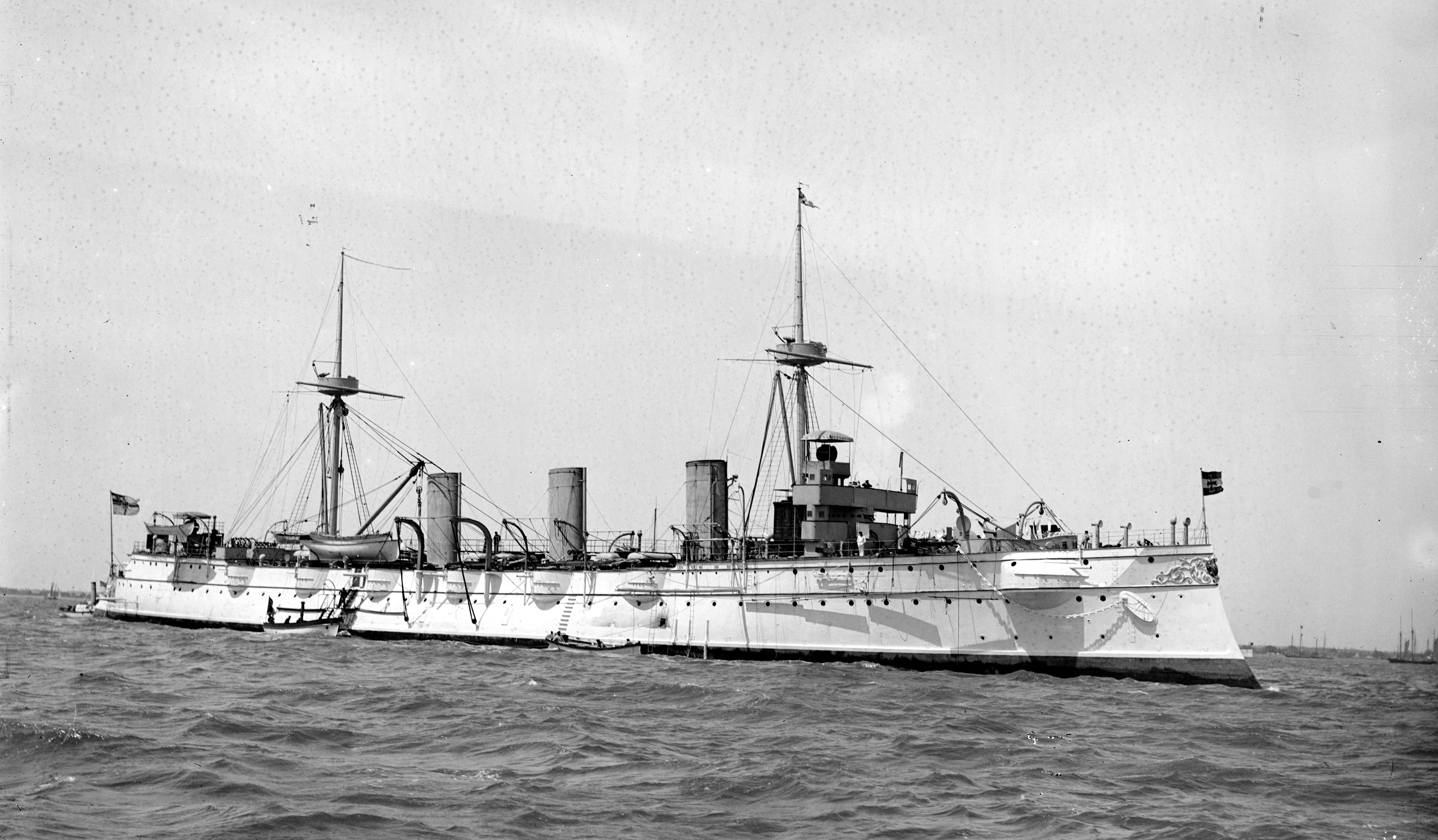
SMS Kaiserin Augusta in 1893

Kaiserin Augusta was a unique protected cruiser built for the German Navy in the early 1890s. She was laid down at the Germaniawerft shipyard in 1890, launched in January 1892, and completed in November of that year. Kaiserin Augusta was designed to serve both as a fleet scout and a colonial cruiser due to budgetary limitations. As built, the ship was armed with a main battery of four 15 cm K L/30 and eight 10.5 cm (4.1 in) SK L/35 guns, though by 1896 they were replaced with twelve newer 15 cm SK L/35 guns. She was the first ship in the German Navy to feature a three-shaft propeller arrangement. The ship had significant stability problems, shipped excessive quantities of water in a head sea, and maneuvered poorly.

Kaiserin Augusta served on foreign stations between 1897 and 1902, primarily in the East Asia Squadron. While in Chinese waters in 1900, the ship's crew assisted in the suppression of the Boxer Uprising. She returned to Germany in 1902 for an extensive overhaul that lasted until 1907, after which she went into reserve. Following the outbreak of World War I in 1914, Kaiserin Augusta was mobilized to serve as a gunnery training ship. She served in this role throughout the war; the ship was ultimately sold for scrapping in October 1919 and broken up the following year.

Summary of the Kaiserin Augusta class
Ship	Armament	Armor	Displacement	Propulsion	Service		
Ship	Armament	Armor	Displacement	Propulsion	Laid down	Commissioned	Fate
Kaiserin Augusta	12 × 15 cm guns	50 mm (2 in)	6,318 t (6,218 long tons)	3 shafts, 3 triple-expansion steam engines, 21 kn (39 km/h; 24 mph)	1890	17 November 1892	Scrapped, 1920

== Victoria Louise class ==
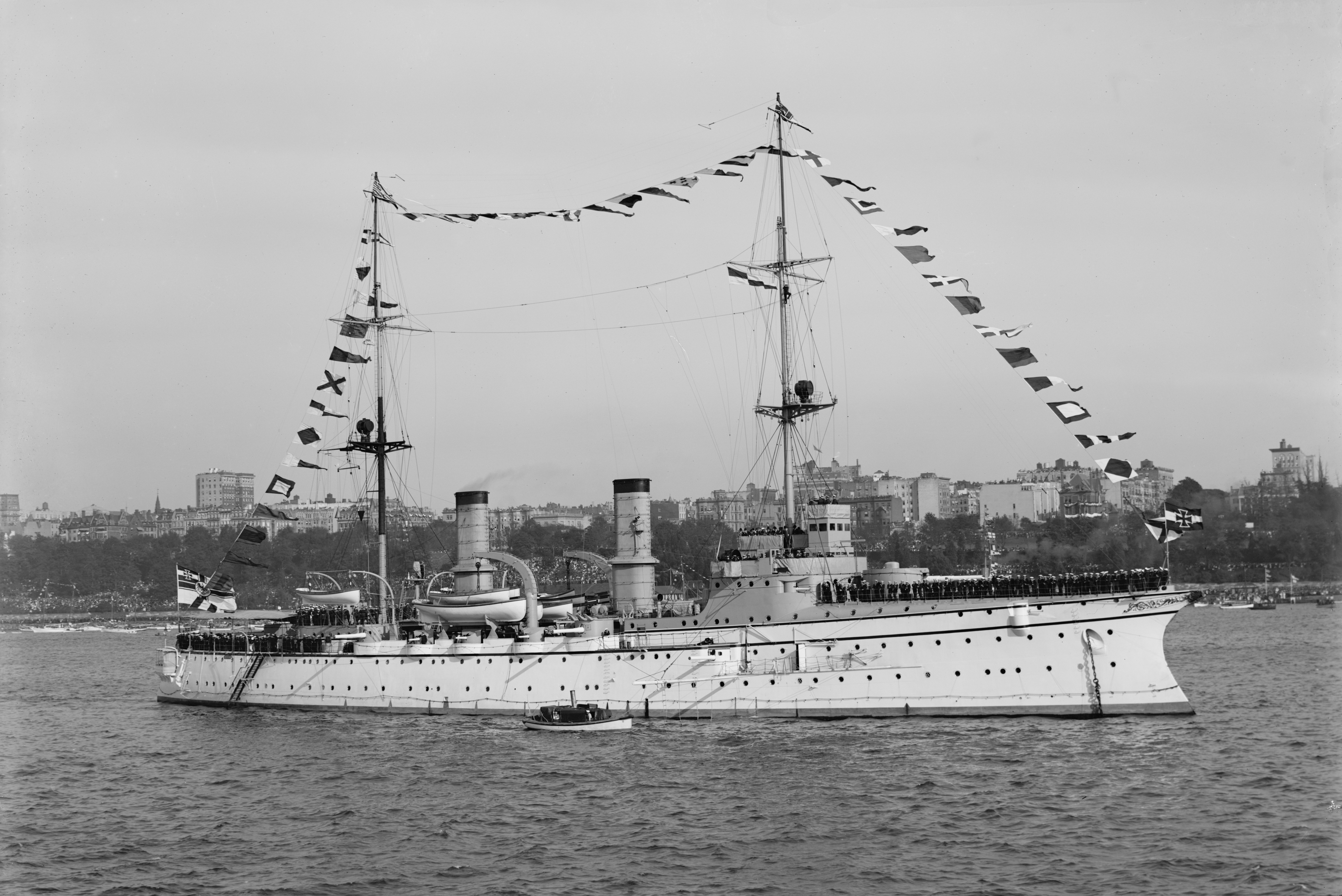
Hertha on a visit to the United States in 1909

The Victoria Louise class was the last class of protected cruisers built for the German Navy. The class design introduced the combined clipper and ram bow and the blocky sides that typified later German armored cruisers. The class comprised five vessels: the lead ship Victoria Louise, Hertha, Freya, Vineta, and Hansa. The ships were laid down in 1895 and 1896, launched in 1897 and 1898, and commissioned into the fleet over the following year. Problems with the Niclausse boilers installed on Vineta prompted the Navy to standardize boiler types in future warships; from then on, only Schulz-Thornycroft or Marine type boilers would be used. All five ships were armed with a main battery of two 21 cm SK L/40 guns and eight 15 cm SK L/40 guns.

The ships of the class served in various units in the German fleet, including on the America Station, in the East Asia Squadron, and with the home fleet. Hertha and Hansa participated in the suppression of the Boxer Uprising in China in 1900, and Vineta was involved in the Venezuela Crisis of 1902–1903. All five ships were modernized between 1905 and 1911, after which they served as training ships for naval cadets. They were mobilized into the 5th Scouting Group at the outbreak of World War I, but were quickly withdrawn from front-line service. They served in various secondary roles for the rest of the war. Afterward, Victoria Louise was converted into a merchant ship, but was broken up in 1923. The other four ships were scrapped in 1920 and 1921.

Summary of the Victoria Louise class
Ship	Armament	Armor	Displacement	Propulsion	Service		
Ship	Armament	Armor	Displacement	Propulsion	Laid down	Commissioned	Fate
Victoria Louise	2 × 21 cm SK L/40; 8 × 15 cm guns	40 mm (1.6 in)	6,491 t (6,388 long tons)	3 shafts, triple-expansion steam engines, 19.5 kn (36.1 km/h; 22.4 mph)	1895	20 February 1899	Scrapped, 1923
Hertha	2 × 21 cm SK L/40; 8 × 15 cm guns	40 mm (1.6 in)	6,491 t (6,388 long tons)	3 shafts, triple-expansion steam engines, 19.5 kn (36.1 km/h; 22.4 mph)	1895	23 July 1898	Scrapped, 1920
Freya	2 × 21 cm SK L/40; 8 × 15 cm guns	40 mm (1.6 in)	6,491 t (6,388 long tons)	3 shafts, triple-expansion steam engines, 19.5 kn (36.1 km/h; 22.4 mph)	1895	20 October 1898	Scrapped, 1921
Vineta	2 × 21 cm SK L/40; 8 × 15 cm guns	40 mm (1.6 in)	6,705 t (6,599 long tons)	3 shafts, triple-expansion steam engines, 18.5 kn (34.3 km/h; 21.3 mph)	1896	13 September 1899	Scrapped, 1920
Hansa	2 × 21 cm SK L/40; 8 × 15 cm guns	40 mm (1.6 in)	6,705 t (6,599 long tons)	3 shafts, triple-expansion steam engines, 18.5 kn (34.3 km/h; 21.3 mph)	1896	20 April 1899	Scrapped, 1920
