= 15 cm Ring Kanone L/30 =

German coastal artillery

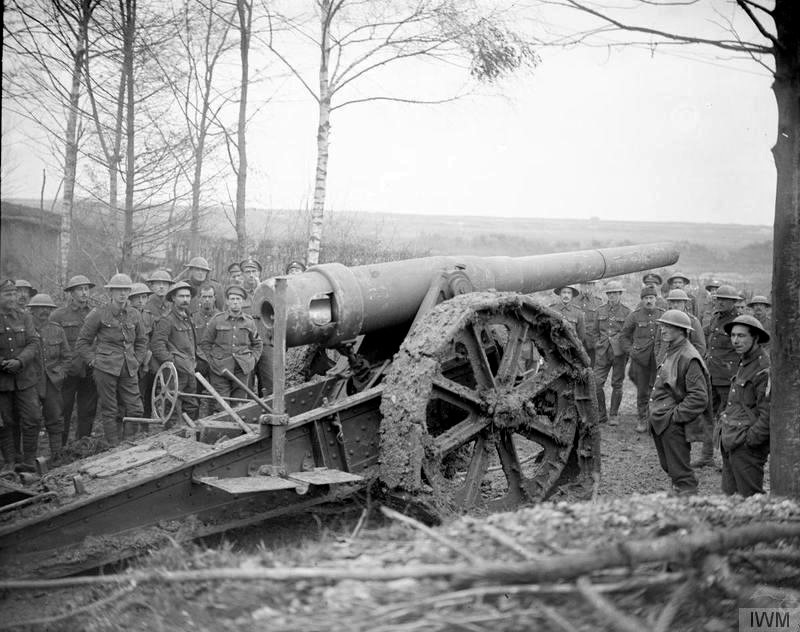
- A 15 cm Ring Kanone L/30 captured by the British at Cambrai.
- Type: Naval gun Coastal artillery Siege gun
- Place of origin: German Empire

Service history
- In service: 1883−1918
- Used by: German Empire
- Wars: World War I

Production history
- Designer: Krupp
- Designed: 1883
- Manufacturer: Krupp
- Produced: 1883
- No. built: 150

Specifications
- Mass: 10 t (9.8 long tons; 11 short tons)
- Barrel length: 4.47 m (14 ft 8 in) L/30
- Shell: Separate-loading, bagged charges and projectiles
- Shell weight: 40 kg (88 lb)
- Caliber: 149.1 mm (5.87 in)
- Breech: Horizontal sliding-block
- Recoil: None
- Carriage: Box trail
- Elevation: +35°
- Traverse: 10°
- Muzzle velocity: 609 m/s (2,000 ft/s)
- Maximum firing range: 12.1 km (7.5 mi)

The 15 cm Ring Kanone L/30 was a naval gun and coastal artillery piece that was used by the German Navy before the First World War. It was converted to a siege gun for the German Army during the First World War, when the ships that carried it were decommissioned.

== History ==
The majority of military planners before the First World War were wedded to the concept of fighting an offensive war of rapid maneuver which in a time before mechanization meant a focus on cavalry and light horse artillery firing shrapnel shells. Although the majority of combatants had heavy field artillery prior to the outbreak of the First World War, none had adequate numbers of heavy guns in service, nor had they foreseen the growing importance of heavy artillery once the Western Front stagnated and trench warfare set in. The theorists hadn't foreseen that trenches, barbed wire, and machine guns had robbed them of the mobility they had been counting on and like in the Franco-Prussian War and Russo-Turkish War.

Once the front stagnated, the need for high-angle heavy artillery reasserted itself. Since aircraft of the period were not yet capable of carrying large diameter bombs, the burden of delivering heavy firepower fell on the artillery. The combatants scrambled to find anything that could fire a heavy shell and that meant emptying the fortresses and scouring the depots for guns held in reserve. It also meant converting coastal artillery and surplus naval guns to siege guns by either giving them simple field carriages or mounting the larger pieces on rail carriages.

== Design ==
=== The navy 15 cm MRK L/30 ===
The 15 cm Ring Kanone L/30 was a typical built-up gun constructed of steel with a central rifled tube, reinforcing layers of hoops, and trunnions. The type of breech was known as a cylindro-prismatic breech which was a predecessor of Krupp's horizontal sliding-block. The gun used separate-loading, bagged charges and projectiles. As a navy gun, the L/30's recoil was handled by a brake system.

=== The army conversion ===
The 15 cm Ring Kanone L/30 was fairly conventional for its time. Most combatants during the First World War had similar conversions of naval guns, such as the British BL 6-inch Mk VII or the French Canon de 155 L modele 1916. The barrels were mounted on simple two-wheeled steel box trail carriages which did not have a recoil mechanism or a gun shield. The carriages were tall and there was an opening behind the breech to allow high angles of elevation. To facilitate towing on soft ground, the wheels were often fitted with Bonagente grousers patented by the Italian major Crispino Bonagente. These consisted of rectangular plates connected with elastic links and are visible in many photographs of World War I artillery from all of the combatants. A set of wooden ramps were placed behind the wheels and when the gun fired the wheels rolled up the ramp and the gun was returned to position by gravity. A drawback of this system was the gun had to be re-aimed each time which lowered the rate of fire.

== Naval use ==
Also see 15 cm MRK L/30

- Carola-class corvettes - This class of ships had a primary armament of ten 15 cm RK L/30 guns in single mounts.
  - SMS Alexandrine
  - SMS Arcona
- Irene-class cruisers - This class of ships had a mixed primary armament of four 15 cm RK L/30 and ten shorter 15 cm RK L/22 guns in single mounts.
  - SMS Irene
  - SMS Prinzess Wilhelm

== Photo gallery ==
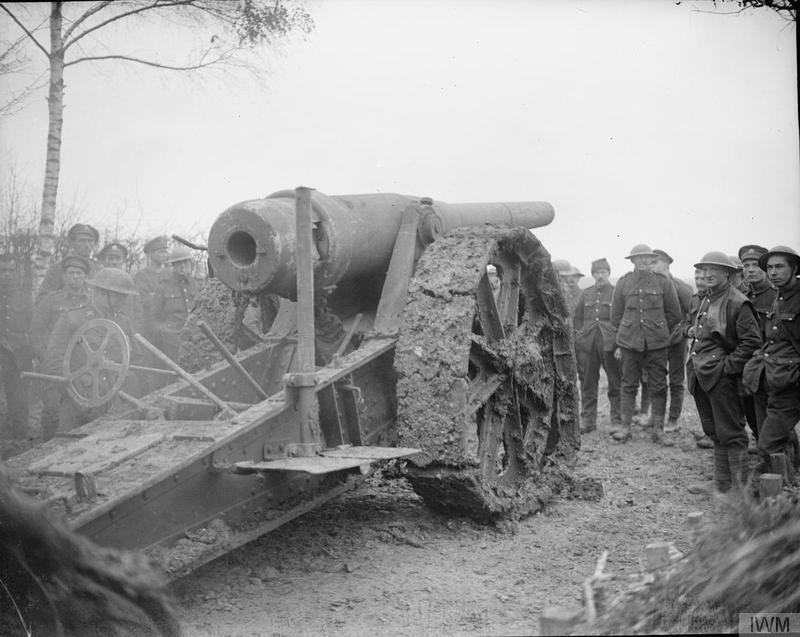
A gun captured at Cambrai by the British.

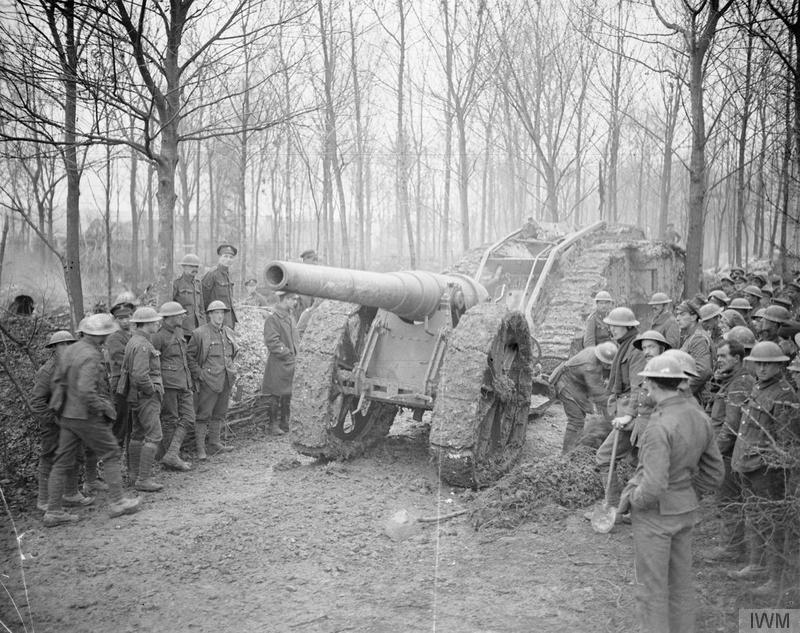
The same gun being towed away by a MK IV tank.

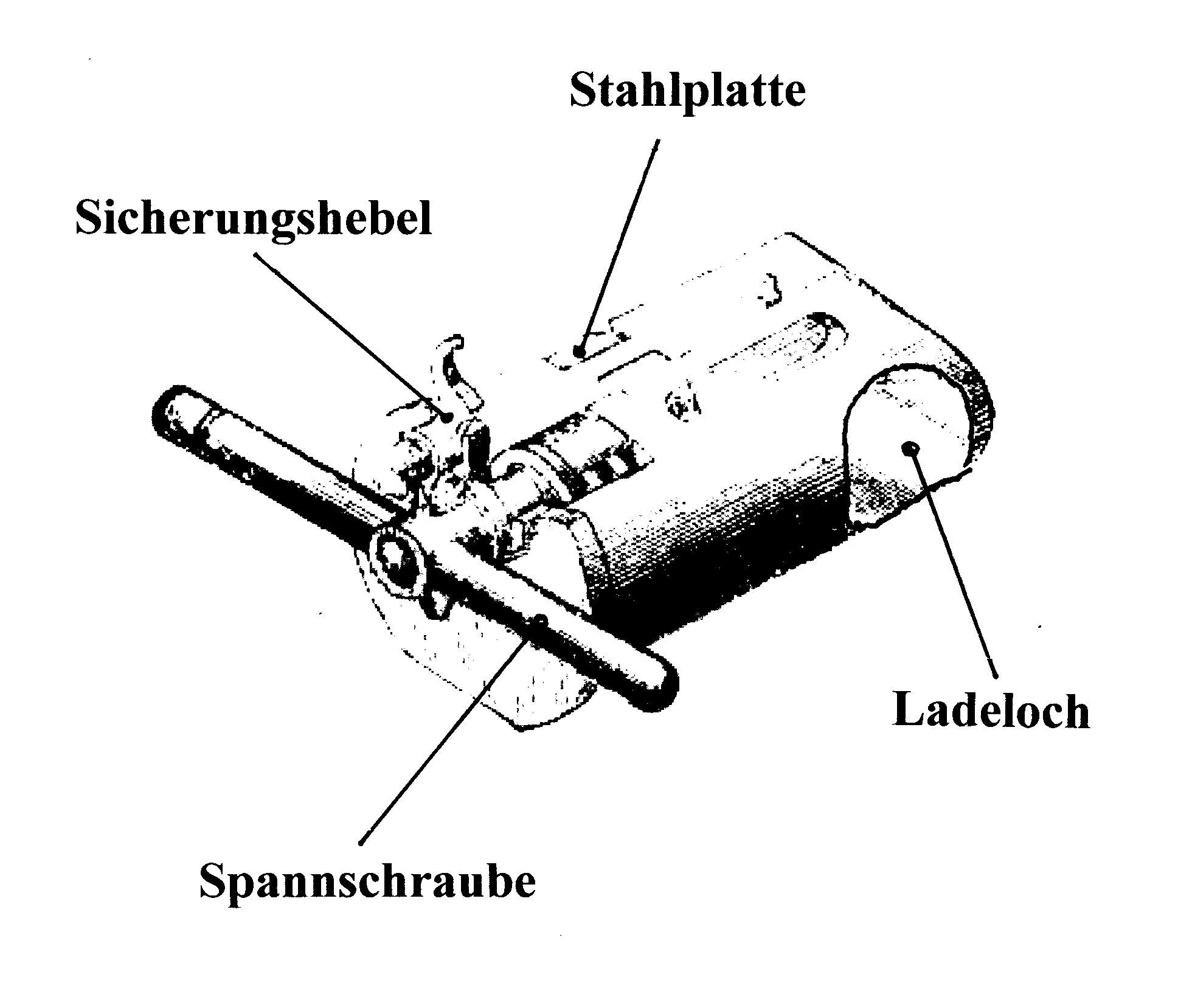
The breech block.
