= Koetei-class gunboat =

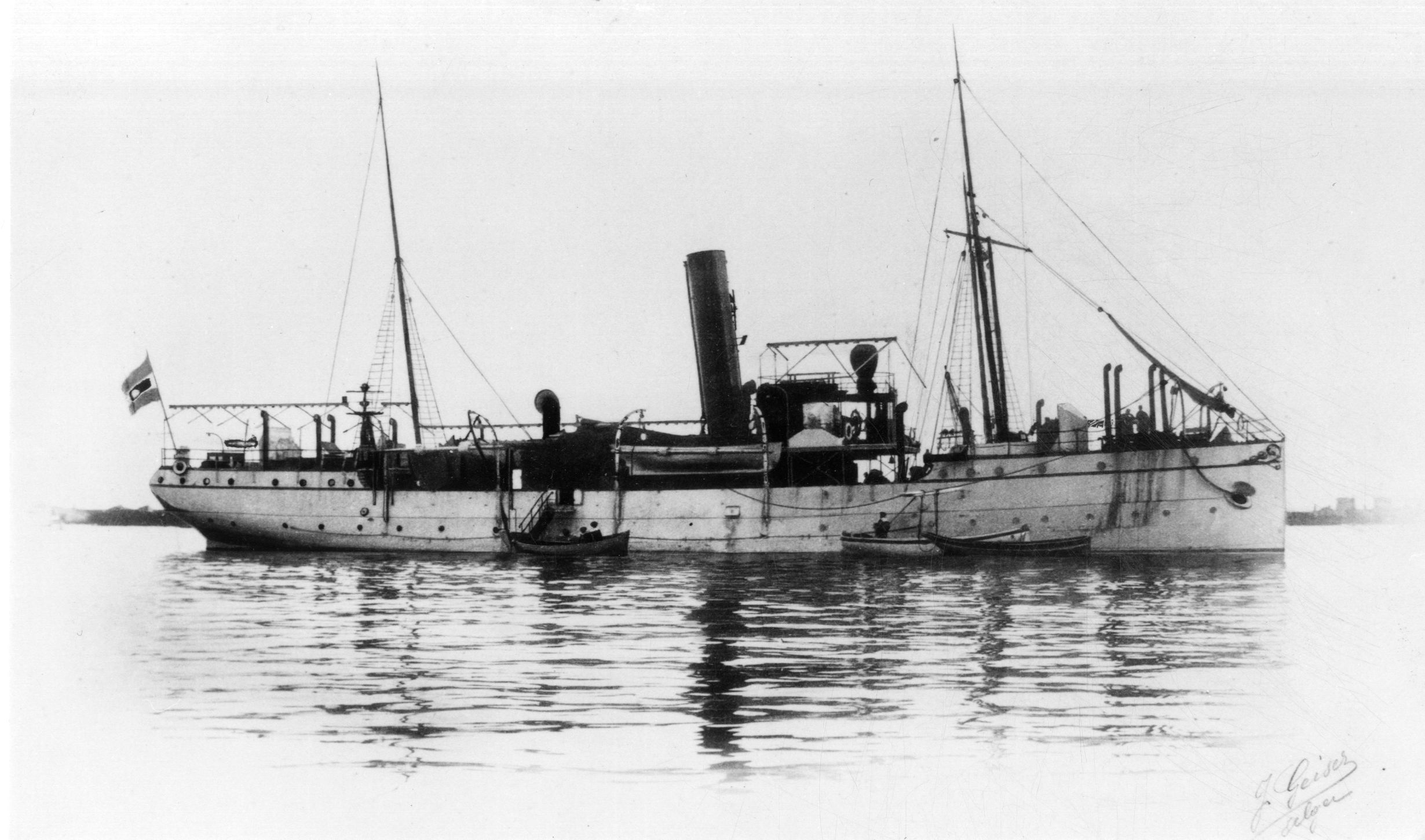
- Siboga

Class overview
- Name: Koetei
- Builders: Nederlandse Scheepsbouw Maatschappij, Amsterdam (2); Maatschappij voor Scheeps- en Werktuigbouw Fijenoord, Rotterdam (1)
- Operators: Royal Netherlands Navy
- Completed: 3

General characteristics
- Type: Gunboat
- Displacement: 778 tons; 788 tons (full load)
- Length: 53.7 m (176 ft 2 in)
- Beam: 9.44 m (31 ft 0 in)
- Draught: 3.69 m (12 ft 1 in)
- Propulsion: 1,380 ihp (1,030 kW), two shafts
- Speed: 13.7 knots (25.4 km/h)
- Complement: 97
- Armament: 2 × 10.5 cm (4.1 in) (2 × 1); 1 × 7.5 cm (3.0 in)

The Koetei-class was a class of three colonial schroefstoomschepen 4e klasse (gunboats) built by the Nederlandse Scheepsbouw Maatschappij in Amsterdam and Maatschappij voor Scheeps- en Werktuigbouw Fijenoord in Rotterdam for the Royal Netherlands Navy. The class comprised Koetei, Siboga and Assahan.

== Description ==
The ship was 53.7 metres (176 ft 2 in) long, had a beam of 9.44 metres (31 ft 0 in), a draught of 3.69 metres (12 ft 1 in), and had a displacement of 778 tons and 788 tons at full load. The ships had a top speed of 13.7 knots (25.4 km/h). The main armaments of the ship were two 10.5 cm (4.1 in) single guns and one 7.5 cm (3.0 in) gun. The ship had a complement of 97 men.

== Construction ==
Name	Builder	Laid down	Launched	Completed	Fate
Koetei	Nederlandse Scheepsbouw Maatschappij	1897	16 April 1898	1898	1931 to Gouvernementsmarine ( Dutch East Indies )
Siboga	Nederlandse Scheepsbouw Maatschappij	1897	28 April 1898	1898	Decommissioned and sold 1933
Assahan	Maatschappij voor Scheeps- en Werktuigbouw Fijenoord	1899	1900	1900	Decommissioned 1924, Sold 1931

== Service history ==
All ships were meant to serve in the Dutch East Indies.

=== Koetei ===
Koetei was laid down at the shipyard of the Nederlandse Scheepsbouw Maatschappij at Amsterdam and launched on 16 April 1898. During a fleet review on 15 September that year held on the Hollands Diep in honor of the coronation of the Dutch queen Wilhelmina of the Netherlands the ship left for the Dutch East Indies. On 27 May 1900 Koetei pulled the Russian steamship Rossia loss. Rossia was stranded at Diamant Punt, Aceh while en route from Odessa to Vladivostok transporting grain and railroad equipment. In 1931 she was moved to subsidiary duties.

=== Siboga ===
Siboga was laid down at the shipyard of the Nederlandse Scheepsbouw Maatschappij at Amsterdam and launched on 28 April 1898. On 1 November that year she was commissioned in the Dutch navy. Later that year on 16 December the ship left for the Dutch East Indies where she arrived in Surabaya. On 7 March 1899 the ship left Surabaya for the Siboga Expedition, which lasted till 26 February 1900. In 1910 she was converted into a minelayer and sold in 1933.

=== Assahan ===
Assahan was laid down at the shipyard of Maatschappij voor Scheeps- en Werktuigbouw Fijenoord at Rotterdam and launched in 1900. 26 October that year she was commissioned in the Dutch navy. The ship was to serve in the Dutch Indies Navy (Indische Militaire Marine). In 1905 the ship took part in an expeditions to South Celebes. The expedition was undertaken against the lord of Boni. Armed sloops of Hertog Hendrik, Zeeland and Assahan protected the landing of Dutch forces near Patiro on 20 July 1905. In 1917 she was converted into a minelayer and sold in 1931.
