= SMS Prinzess Wilhelm =

Protected cruiser of the German Imperial Navy

- Prinzess Wilhelm

History

German Empire
- Name: SMS Prinzess Wilhelm
- Namesake: Augusta Victoria of Schleswig-Holstein
- Builder: Germaniawerft, Kiel
- Laid down: May 1886
- Launched: 22 September 1887
- Commissioned: 13 November 1889
- Decommissioned: 22 July 1899
- Reclassified: Mine hulk in 1914
- Stricken: 17 February 1914
- Fate: Broken up in 1922

General characteristics
- Class & type: Irene-class cruiser
- Displacement: Normal: 4,271 t (4,204 long tons); Full load: 5,027 t (4,948 long tons)
- Length: 103.7 m (340 ft) oa
- Beam: 14.2 m (47 ft)
- Draft: 6.74 m (22.1 ft)
- Installed power: 4 × fire-tube boilers; 8,000 PS (7,900 ihp)
- Propulsion: 2 × double-expansion steam engines; 2 × screw propellers
- Speed: 18 knots (33.3 km/h)
- Range: 2,490 nmi (4,610 km; 2,870 mi) at 9 kn (17 km/h; 10 mph)
- Complement: 28 officers; 337 enlisted men
- Armament: 14 × 15 cm (5.9 in) guns; 8 × 10.5 cm (4.1 in) SK L/35; 6 × 3.7 cm (1.5 in) revolving cannon; 3 × 35 cm (13.8 in) torpedo tubes
- Armor: Deck: 50 to 75 mm (2 to 3 in); Conning tower: 50 mm

SMS Prinzess Wilhelm ("His Majesty's Ship Princess Wilhelm") (Note: "SMS" stands for "Seiner Majestät Schiff" (German: His Majesty's Ship).) was a protected cruiser of the German Imperial Navy (Kaiserliche Marine). She was the second Irene-class cruiser; her only sister ship was SMS Irene. Prinzess Wilhelm (Note: Or Prinzeß in German, with a "sharp S"; see ß.) was laid down in 1886 at the Germaniawerft shipyard in Kiel, launched in September 1887, and commissioned into the fleet in November 1889. The cruiser was named after Augusta Victoria of Schleswig-Holstein, first wife of Kaiser Wilhem II. As built, the ship was armed with a main battery of fourteen 15 cm (5.9 in) guns and had a top speed of 18 knots (33 km/h; 21 mph).

In 1895, Prinzess Wilhelm was deployed to East Asian waters, where she frequently served as the flagship of the East Asia Cruiser Division. She was one of the three ships that participated in the seizure of the Jiaozhou Bay Leased Territory under the command of Rear Admiral Otto von Diederichs. She subsequently was present in the Philippines in the immediate aftermath of the Battle of Manila Bay between American and Spanish squadrons during the Spanish–American War in 1898. Prinzess Wilhelm returned to Germany in 1899 and was modernized in 1899–1903. She was reduced to a mine hulk in February 1914 and ultimately broken up for scrap in 1922.

== Design ==
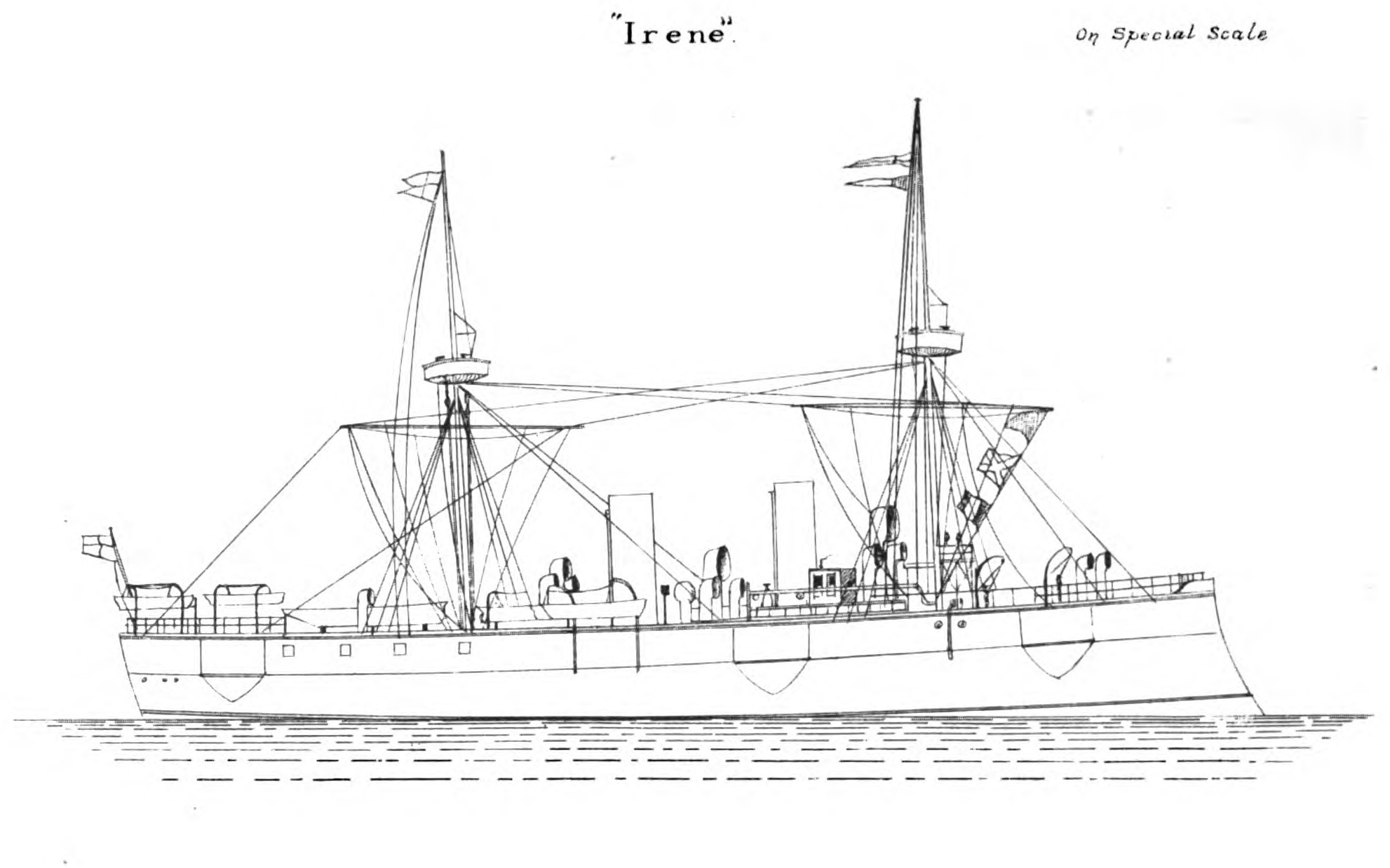
Drawing of Irene

In 1883, General Leo von Caprivi became the Chief of the Imperial Admiralty, and at the time, the pressing question that confronted all of the major navies was what type of cruiser to build to replace the obsolete rigged screw corvettes that had been built in the 1860s and 1870s. Cruisers could be optimized for service with the main fleet or for deployments abroad, and while the largest navies could afford to build dedicated ships of each type, Germany could not. To solve the problem, the Germans would build 2nd-class cruisers that attempted to fulfill both roles. The first cruiser design built under this program was the Irene class.

Prinzess Wilhelm was 103.7 meters (340 ft) long overall and had a beam of 14.2 m (47 ft) and a draft of 6.74 m (22.1 ft) forward. She displaced 4,271 t (4,204 long tons) normally and up to 5,027 t (4,948 long tons; 5,541 short tons) at full load. Her propulsion system consisted of two horizontal AG Germania 2-cylinder double-expansion steam engines that drove a pair of screw propellers. Steam was provided by four coal-fired fire-tube boilers, which were ducted into a pair of funnels. These provided a top speed of 18 kn (33 km/h; 21 mph) and a range of approximately 2,490 nautical miles (4,610 km; 2,870 mi) at 9 kn (17 km/h; 10 mph). She had a crew of 28 officers and 337 enlisted men.

The ship was armed with a main battery of four 15 cm RK L/30 guns in single pedestal mounts, supplied with 400 rounds of ammunition in total. They had a range of 8,500 m (27,900 ft). Prinzess Wilhelm also carried ten shorter-barreled 15 cm RK L/22 guns in single mounts. These guns had a much shorter range, at 5,400 m (17,700 ft). The gun armament was rounded out by six 3.7 cm revolver cannon, which provided close-range defense against torpedo boats. She was also equipped with three 35 cm (13.8 in) torpedo tubes with eight torpedoes, two launchers were mounted on the deck and the third was in the bow, below the waterline.

The ship's main armor protection consisted of a curved deck that was 50 mm (2 in) on the flat portion, increasing in thickness toward the sides to 75 mm (3 in), where it sloped downward to the side of the hull. The conning tower had sides that were 50 mm thick.

=== Modifications ===
The ship was modernized in Wilhelmshaven in between 1892 and 1893. The ship's armament was significantly improved; the four L/30 guns were replaced with 15 cm SK L/35 guns with an increased range of 10,000 m (11,000 yd). A secondary battery of eight 10.5 cm (4.1 in) SK L/35 quick-firing (QF) guns was installed in place of the L/22 guns, and six 5 cm (2 in) SK L/40 QF guns were added. Some equipment was removed in an effort to reduce the ship's excessive weight, including anti-torpedo nets, an auxiliary boiler, the steam winch used to hoist the ship's boats, and other miscellaneous equipment.

== Service history ==
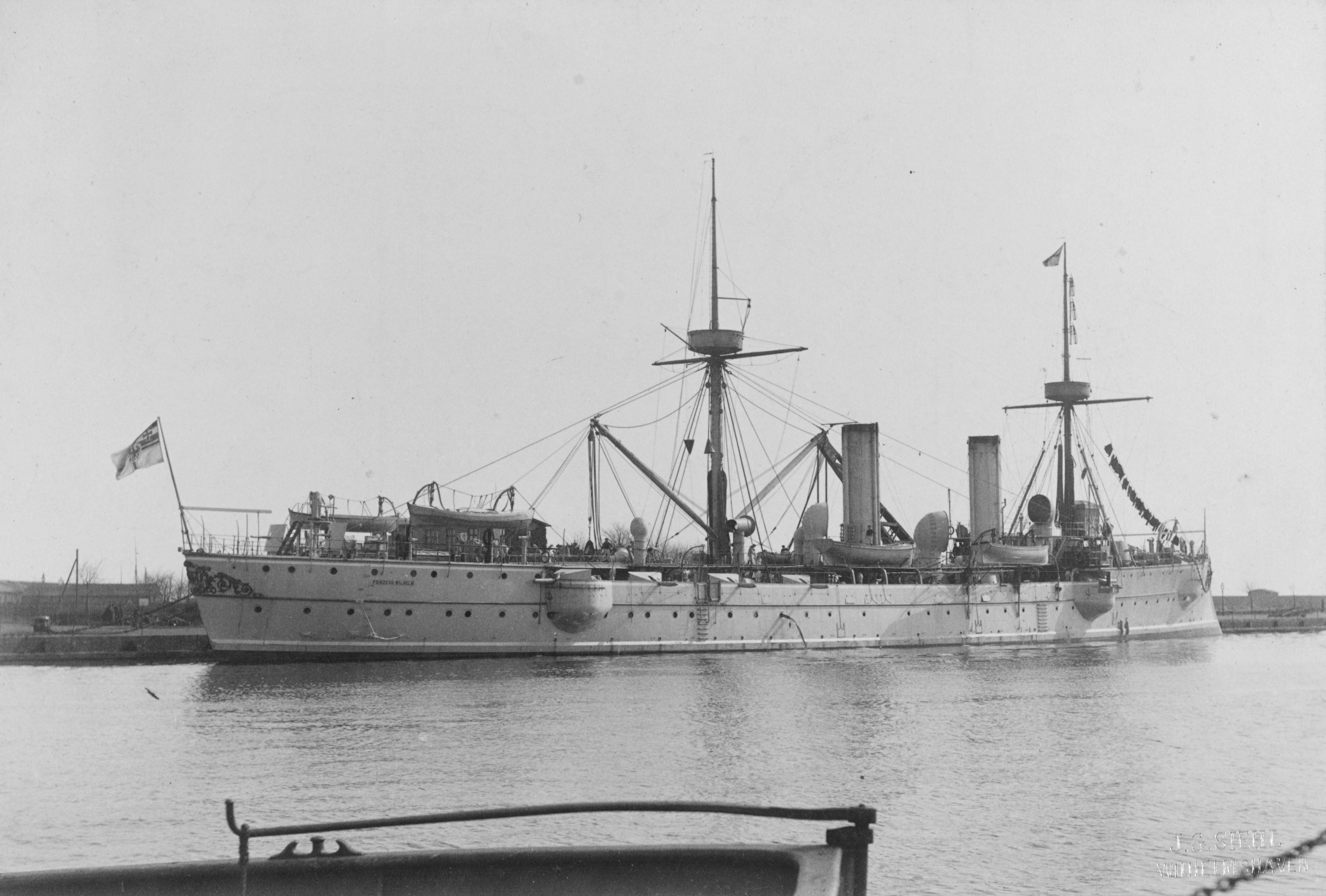
SMS Prinzess Wilhelm

Prinzess Wilhelm was the second protected cruiser built by the German navy. She was ordered under the contract name "Ersatz Ariadne", (Note: German warships were ordered under provisional names. Additions to the fleet were given a single letter; ships intended to replace older or lost vessels were ordered as "Ersatz (name of the ship to be replaced)".) and was laid down at the Germaniawerft shipyard in Kiel in May 1886. She was launched on 22 September 1887, and at the launching ceremony, Princess Augusta (the ship's namesake) christened the vessel. (Note: According to the historians Hans Hildebrand, Albert Röhr, and Hans-Otto Steinmetz, it is unclear why the navy chose to use Augusta Victoria's title as wife of Prince Wilhelm instead of her actual name, as they did with the sister ship Irene.) Fitting-out work thereafter commenced. She was commissioned into the German navy on 19 November 1889 to begin sea trials, which lasted until 25 March 1890. In the first maneuvers of 1890, the newly commissioned Prinzess Wilhelm operated as the opposing force with several old corvettes. A second round of trials followed from 16 April to 20 June 1891, under the command of Kapitän zur See (KzS—Captain at Sea) Oscar Boeters; during this period, in late May, the ship returned to the shipyard for alterations.

Upon completing her trials, Prinzess Wilhelm was assigned to II Division of the Maneuver Fleet, but almost immediately, she was detached to escort the artillery training ship Mars to Helgoland; Wilhelm II and Augusta, now the Kaiser and Kaiserin, respectively, had boarded the latter vessel for the trip. The imperial couple then transferred to their yacht, Hohenzollern, for a cruise that included stops in Cowes and Leith in the United Kingdom, and Tromsø and Nordkapp in Norway. Prinzess Wilhelm escorted the yacht on the cruise, which ended in Kiel. After arriving home, a pipe burst aboard Prinzess Wilhelm, which necessitated repairs. The ship then embarked on a short training cruise that concluded in Wilhelmshaven on 15 October.

On 11 February 1892, Prinzess Wilhelm was sent to Britain to assist the Norddeutscher Lloyd (North German Lloyd) freighter SS Eider, which had run aground on the Isle of Wight on 31 January. Prinzess Wilhelm thereafter visited ports in Ireland and Scotland before returning to Kiel on 24 March. After taking part in training exercises, Prinzess Wilhelm rejoined II Division to escort Wilhelm II to meet the Russian Tsar, Alexander III in Stettin, Germany in June, followed by a summer cruise to Norway. In early August, the ship was sent to the Mediterranean to represent Germany in the 400th anniversary of the voyage of Christopher Columbus, celebrations for which were held in Spain and Italy. She was the only German ship sent to the ceremonies in Genoa, Italy, a result of cooling relations between Germany and Italy at the time. The ship thereafter visited Alexandria, Egypt, from 20 to 25 September, where the captain visited the recently crowned Khedive Abbas II of Egypt, and to present him the Order of the Red Eagle, which the Kaiser had awarded him. The ship arrived back in Wilhelmshaven on 14 November, where she was decommissioned.

Prinzess Wilhelm underwent a modernization that lasted until 10 October 1893, when she was recommissioned for service as a guard ship stationed in Wilhelmshaven. At that time, Korvettenkapitän (kk—Corvette Captain) Georg Sarnow took command of the ship. In early 1894, she was also used as a training ship for engine room and boiler crews. She also embarked Wilhelm II for a short cruise into the North Sea with three torpedo boats. The ship went on a cruise into the Baltic in mid-1894, and in August, she once again joined Hohenzollern for the Kaiser's annual visit to the Cowes Regatta. In the 1894 autumn maneuvers, Prinzess Wilhelm served as the flagship of a reconnaissance flotilla. Prinzess Wilhelm ran aground off the town of Rønne, Denmark, and had to be pulled free by the corvette Blücher and the old brig Musquito. The ship returned to Wilhelmshaven for repairs to her hull that lasted until 17 October. She thereafter resumed duty as the local guard ship, at which time KK Ludwig Borckenhagen replaced Sarnow as the ship's captain.

=== East Asia Squadron ===
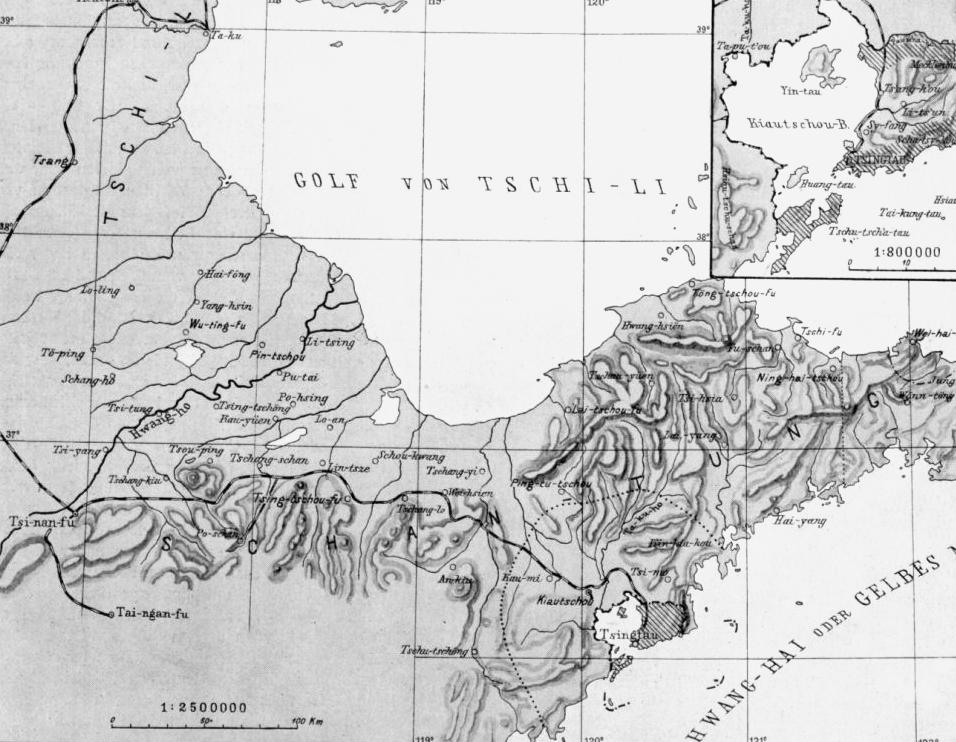
German 1912 map of the Shandong Peninsula showing the Jiaozhou Bay Leased Territory

In January 1895, Prinzess Wilhelm was ordered to Asia to reinforce the East Asia Division stationed there; she was to replace the old screw corvette Marie. After her crew completed preparations for the lengthy deployment abroad, during which time KK Henning von Holtzendorff relieved now-KzS Borckenhagen, Prinzess Wilhelm left Wilhelmshaven on 27 April. While the ship passed through the Red Sea, several men of the crew died from heat stroke due to the extreme temperatures and poor ventilation. Those who died were buried in Aden. Prinzess Wilhelm arrived in Shanghai, China, on 4 July, where she met her sister Irene, which was serving as the division's flagship. After she joined her sister Irene in East Asian waters, the division was reinforced with the rebuilt old ironclad Kaiser, the unprotected cruiser Cormoran, the corvette Arcona, and the gunboat Iltis. In June 1896, Alfred von Tirpitz took command of the division. That year, Prinzess Wilhelm assisted in the suppression of a major fire in Hakodate, Japan, and later surveyed the Huangpu River as a potential naval base for the squadron. By November, Prinzess Wilhelm was in bad need of maintenance, as engine problems limited her to half-speed. Accordingly, she was docked at Nagasaki, Japan, on 6 December for repairs.

While anchored in Port Hamilton in May 1896, Prinzess Wilhelm received orders to enter the Yangtze river in China and steam to the city of Nanjing. German military instructors working with the Qing army had come under attack from trainees at the military academy there, and Prinzess Wilhelm and Iltis were to respond. The appearance of the two warships intimidated the soldiers into dispersing, and the vessels did not have to actively intervene. The Germans remained there for four weeks to ensure the situation remained calm, and Prinzess Wilhelm then continued further upriver. She became the first major German warship to visit Hankou, which she reached on 11 July. The ship then returned downriver, reaching Yantai at the end of the month, where she rendezvoused with the rest of the division. In August, KK Adolf Thiele replaced Holtzendorff. She was present for the burial of the men who died when Iltis sank in July. From mid-September to early November, Prinzess Wilhelm returned to Nagasaki for another overhaul of her propulsion system.

Prinzess Wilhelm did not remain out of the drydock in Nagasaki for long; a major machinery breakdown in mid-December forced her return for repairs that lasted until mid-January 1897. In June, Rear Admiral Otto von Diederichs arrived in Asia to take command of the division; Prinzess Wilhelm, Irene, and Arcona were in Yantai conducting gunnery training. Diederichs, aboard Kaiser, joined the rest of the division in Yantai at the end of the month. There, he held a series of ceremonial visits with the captains of each of his ships. On 1 July, Diederichs boarded Prinzess Wilhelm to make a visit to the Chinese capital at Beijing. There, he attempted to negotiate with the Chinese government to acquire a permanent naval base for the division. Diederichs, who sought the port of Jiaozhou, was unsuccessful in his attempt, and so he returned to Prinzess Wilhelm on 11 July. While leaving Beijing, he examined the Taku Forts that guarded the entrance to Beijing. Diederichs returned to the division on 16 July, after which he conducted a tour of Asian ports with the entire division.

==== Seizure of Jiaozhou ====
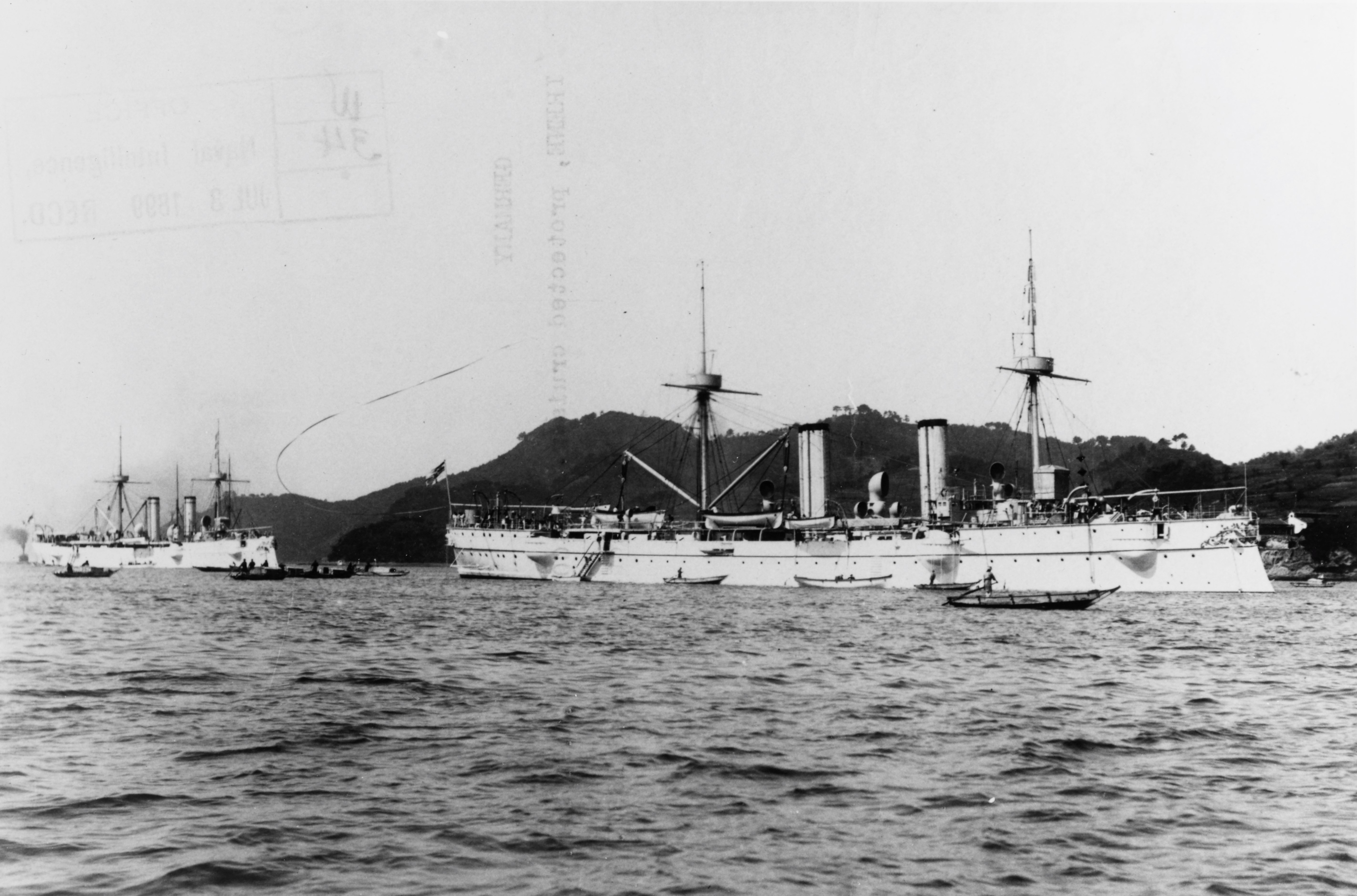
Irene (right) and Prinzess Wilhelm (astern)

In October, Diederichs planned to rotate his ships through repair facilities in the region for periodic maintenance; Prinzess Wilhelm was scheduled to dock in Shanghai. He requested permission to take Prinzess Wilhelm and Kaiser to Jiaozhou for autumn gunnery training and to leave Prinzess Wilhelm stationed there during the winter, which was denied. Diederichs was able to make use of the murder of a pair of German priests on 6 November in Shandong, however, to justify his move against Jiaozhou. At the time, the only ships available for the attack were Prinzess Wilhelm and Kaiser. Cormoran joined the two ships after a few days, and by 10 November, the ships were ready. Prinzess Wilhelm left port on the 11th, to rendezvous with Kaiser and Cormoran at sea.

On the night 12 November, the three ships met and formed into line; the attack was scheduled to begin on the morning of 14 November with a bombardment from the warships. The crews of Prinzess Wilhelm and Kaiser were to form a landing party to seize the harbor. The flotilla arrived on the morning of the 13th. The following morning, the landing party of some 700 officers and men—which was commanded by Thiele—was landed on the main pier in the harbor. The Chinese were caught completely by surprise, and the Germans secured their objectives within two hours; Diederichs convinced the Chinese commander, General Chang, to withdraw from Jiaozhou. The Imperial flag was raised in the town and Prinzess Wilhelm fired a 21-gun salute. The landing party remained in Jiaozhou to garrison the port, and several 3.7 cm guns were removed from the ships to provide artillery to the force.

Diederichs requested reinforcements from Germany, and the Kaiser authorized a second Division to deploy to the East Asia station. The unit was therefore reorganized as the East Asia Squadron; Prinzess Wilhelm was assigned to the I Division of the squadron. On 27 November, Diederichs was promoted to vice admiral for his success in seizing Jiaozhou, and given command of the new squadron. Chinese forces converged on the port by the end of the month. Prinzess Wilhelm and Kaiser moved into the harbor to provide artillery support. General Chang, who had been placed under house arrest, was discovered to have been attempting to subvert the German occupation; Dierderichs therefore placed him under arrest aboard Prinzess Wilhelm. A brief skirmish ensued, which quickly resulted in a Chinese rout. On 8 January 1898, a force of 50 men from Prinzess Wilhelm's crew was sent to Chi-mo to defend against Chinese raids in the area. That month, KK Oskar von Truppel replaced Thiele as Prinzess Wilhelm's captain.

==== The Philippines during the Spanish–American War ====
In the spring of 1898, Prince Heinrich arrived in Asia. While awaiting his arrival, Diederichs planned to rotate his ships through dockyards for periodic maintenance. On 4 May, Diederichs made Prinzess Wilhelm his flagship and sent Kaiser to Nagasaki and followed the next day, after Prince Heinrich reached Jiaozhou. The Spanish–American War had broken out on 25 April and Commodore George Dewey had defeated the Spanish squadron at the Battle of Manila Bay on 1 May. Diederichs planned to use the crisis as an opportunity to seize another base for the squadron in Asia. Upon arriving in Nagasaki, Diederichs learned the shipyard had not yet completed repairs to Kaiser, and so was unable to refit Prinzess Wilhelm for some time. He therefore ordered Kaiserin Augusta to meet him in Nagasaki, which he would use as his temporary flagship. Prinzess Wilhelm and Kaiser were to rejoin Diederichs once their repairs were completed.

On 20 June, Prinzess Wilhelm arrived in the Philippines; Diederichs now had a force of five warships: Prinzess Wilhelm, Kaiser, Irene, Kaiserin Augusta, and Cormoran. After her arrival, Prinzess Wilhelm proceeded to Mariveles to replenish her coal supplies and receive new crewmen from the transport Darmstadt. On 9 August, the American squadron in the Bay ordered the neutral warships in the harbor to leave the bombardment zone, and so Prinzess Wilhelm and the other German ships went to Mariveles. Following the fall of the city, most of the German ships departed the Philippines; only Prinzess Wilhelm remained on station to protect German nationals in the islands. She was replaced by Arcona in October. In mid-November, Kaiser ran aground and had to go into drydock for repairs; Diederichs therefore made Prinzess Wilhelm his flagship. She served as Diederich's flagship until January 1899, when she was drydocked in Hong Kong for periodic maintenance. She thereafter returned to Qingdao, where she received orders to return to Germany. She departed on 26 April and arrived in Wilhelmshaven in July; she was decommissioned there on 22 July.

=== Fate ===
After returning to Germany in 1899, she went into drydock at the Kaiserliche Werft (Imperial Shipyard) in Wilhelmshaven for modernization; work lasted until 1902. She nevertheless never returned to active service. She was stricken from the naval register on 17 February 1914 and used as a storage hulk for naval mines for the duration of World War I. She was initially based in Danzig, but later moved to Kiel and Wilhelmshaven. On 26 November 1921, Prinzess Wilhelm was sold for 909,000 Marks. She was broken up the following year in Wilhelmshaven.
