= SMS Irene =

Protected cruiser of the German Imperial Navy

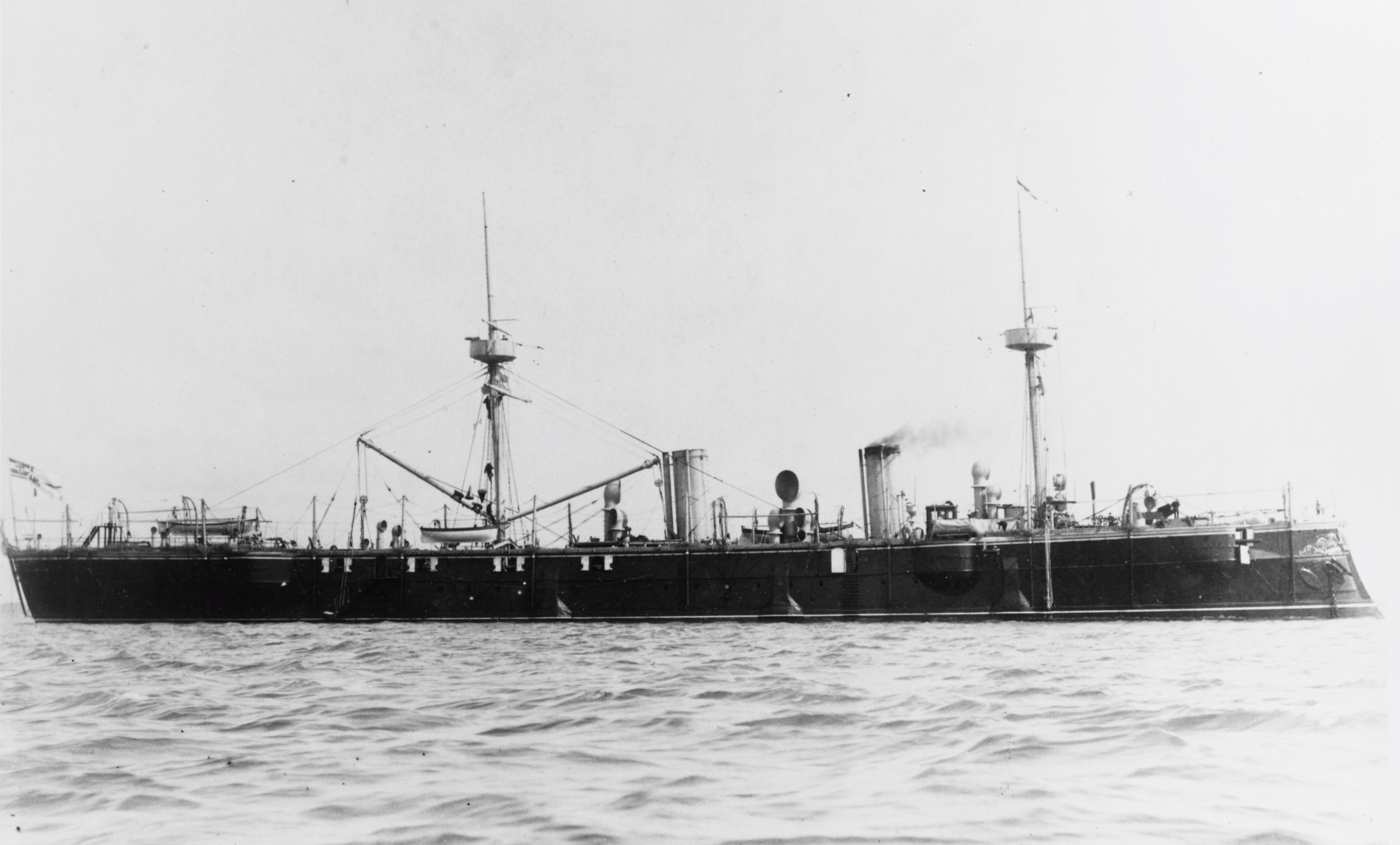
- SMS Irene at anchor, date unknown

History

German Empire
- Name: SMS Irene
- Namesake: Princess Irene of Hesse and by Rhine
- Builder: AG Vulcan Stettin, Stettin
- Laid down: May 1886
- Launched: 23 July 1887
- Commissioned: 25 May 1888
- Decommissioned: 1 October 1901
- Reclassified: U-boat depot ship in 1914
- Stricken: 17 February 1914
- Fate: Broken up in 1922

General characteristics
- Class & type: Irene-class cruiser
- Displacement: Normal: 4,271 t (4,204 long tons); Full load: 5,027 t (4,948 long tons)
- Length: 103.7 m (340 ft) oa
- Beam: 14.2 m (47 ft)
- Draft: 6.74 m (22.1 ft)
- Installed power: 4 × fire-tube boilers; 8,000 PS (7,900 ihp)
- Propulsion: 2 × double-expansion steam engines; 2 × screw propellers
- Speed: 18 knots (33.3 km/h)
- Range: 2,490 nmi (4,610 km; 2,870 mi) at 9 kn (17 km/h; 10 mph)
- Complement: 28 officers; 337 enlisted men
- Armament: 14 × 15 cm (5.9 in) guns; 6 × 3.7 cm (1.5 in) revolving cannon; 3 × 35 cm (13.8 in) torpedo tubes
- Armor: Deck: 50 to 75 mm (2 to 3 in); Conning tower: 50 mm

SMS Irene was a protected cruiser or Kreuzerkorvette of the German Imperial Navy (Kaiserliche Marine) and the lead ship of the Irene class. She had one sister, Prinzess Wilhelm; the two ships were the first protected cruisers built by the German Navy. Irene was laid down in 1886 at the AG Vulcan shipyard in Stettin, launched in July 1887, and commissioned into the fleet in May 1888. The cruiser was named after Princess Irene of Hesse and by Rhine, sister-in-law of Kaiser Wilhelm II. As built, the ship was armed with a main battery of fourteen 15 cm (5.9 in) guns and had a top speed of 18 knots (33 km/h; 21 mph).

Irene saw extensive service with the German fleet in the first years of her career, frequently escorting Kaiser Wilhelm II's yacht on cruises throughout Europe. In 1894, she was deployed to East Asian waters; she was in dock for engine maintenance in November 1897 when Otto von Diederichs seized the naval base Jiaozhou Bay, and so she was not present during the operation. She was present in the Philippines in the immediate aftermath of the Battle of Manila Bay between American and Spanish squadrons during the Spanish–American War in 1898. Irene eventually returned to Germany in 1901. She remained in service until early 1914, when she was retired from front-line service and converted into a submarine tender. She served in this capacity until 1921, when she was sold for scrap and broken up the following year.

== Design ==
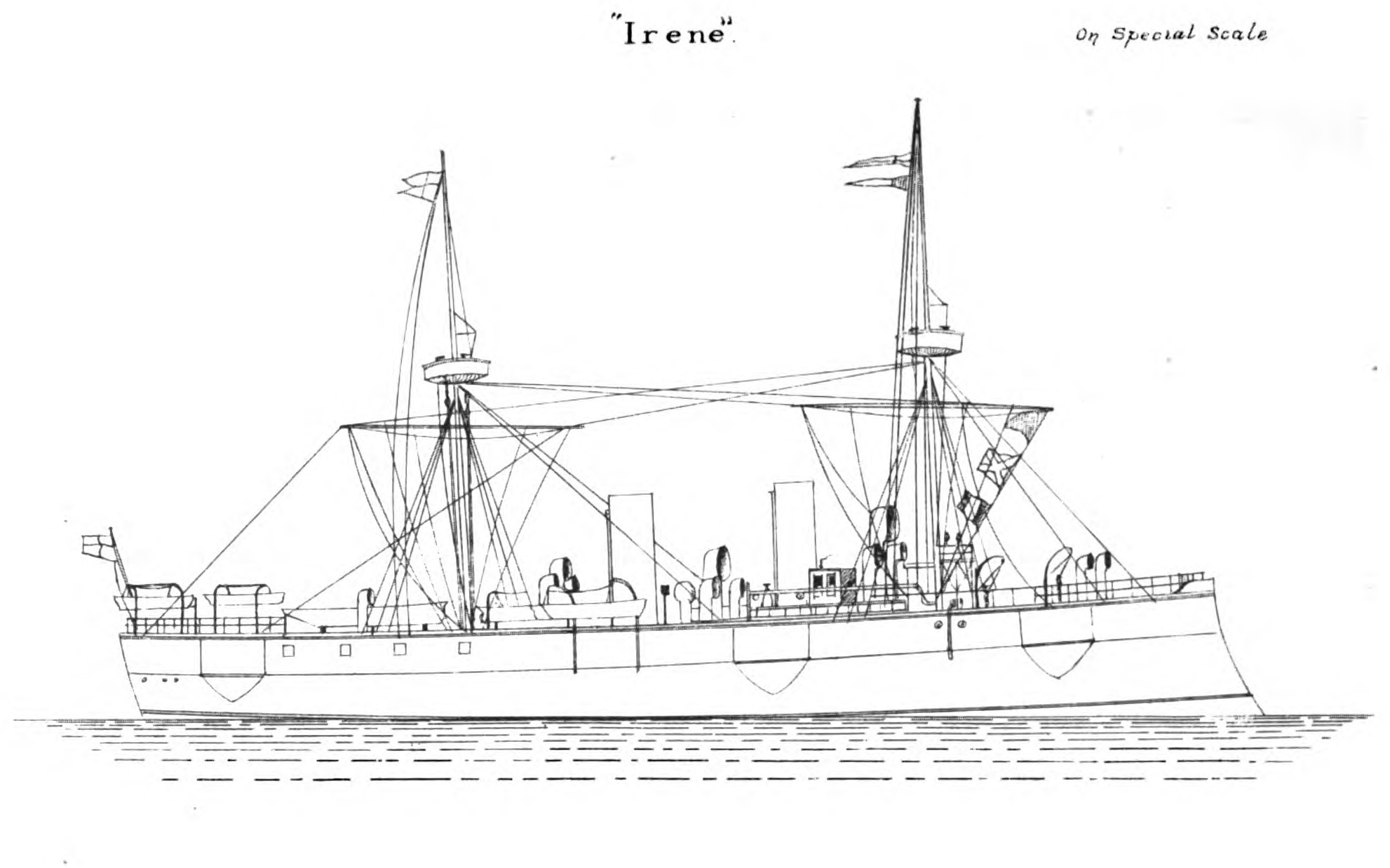
Drawing of Irene

In 1883, General Leo von Caprivi became the Chief of the Imperial Admiralty, and at the time, the pressing question that confronted all of the major navies was what type of cruiser to build to replace the obsolete rigged screw corvettes that had been built in the 1860s and 1870s. Cruisers could be optimized for service with the main fleet or for deployments abroad, and while the largest navies could afford to build dedicated ships of each type, Germany could not. To solve the problem, the Germans would build 2nd-class cruisers that attempted to fulfill both roles. The first cruiser design built under this program was the Irene class.

Irene was 103.7 meters (340 ft) long overall and had a beam of 14.2 m (47 ft) and a draft of 6.74 m (22.1 ft) forward. She displaced 4,271 t (4,204 long tons) normally and up to 5,027 t (4,948 long tons; 5,541 short tons) at full load. Her propulsion system consisted of two Wolfsche 2-cylinder, double-expansion steam engines that drove a pair of screw propellers. Steam was provided by four coal-fired fire-tube boilers, which were ducted into a pair of funnels. These provided a top speed of 18 kn (33 km/h; 21 mph) and a range of approximately 2,490 nautical miles (4,610 km; 2,870 mi) at 9 kn (17 km/h; 10 mph). She had a crew of 28 officers and 337 enlisted men.

The ship was armed with a main battery of four 15 cm RK L/30 guns in single pedestal mounts, supplied with 400 rounds of ammunition in total. They had a range of 8,500 m (27,900 ft). Irene also carried ten shorter-barreled 15 cm RK L/22 guns in single mounts. These guns had a much shorter range, at 5,400 m (17,700 ft). The gun armament was rounded out by six 3.7 cm revolver cannon, which provided close-range defense against torpedo boats. She was also equipped with three 35 cm (13.8 in) torpedo tubes with eight torpedoes, two launchers were mounted on the deck and the third was in the bow, below the waterline.

The ship's main armor protection consisted of a curved deck that was 50 mm (2 in) on the flat portion, increasing in thickness toward the sides to 75 mm (3 in), where it sloped downward to the side of the hull. The conning tower had sides that were 50 mm thick.

=== Modifications ===
The ship was modernized in Wilhelmshaven in 1893. The ship's armament was significantly improved; the four L/30 guns were replaced with 15 cm SK L/35 guns with an increased range of 10,000 m (11,000 yd). A secondary battery of eight 10.5 cm (4.1 in) SK L/35 quick-firing (QF) guns was installed in place of the L/22 guns, and six 5 cm (2 in) SK L/40 QF guns were added. Some equipment was removed in an effort to reduce the ship's excessive weight, including anti-torpedo nets, an auxiliary boiler, the steam winch used to hoist the ship's boats, and other miscellaneous equipment. Other changes included lowering the bulwarks and altering the anchor chains.

== Service history ==
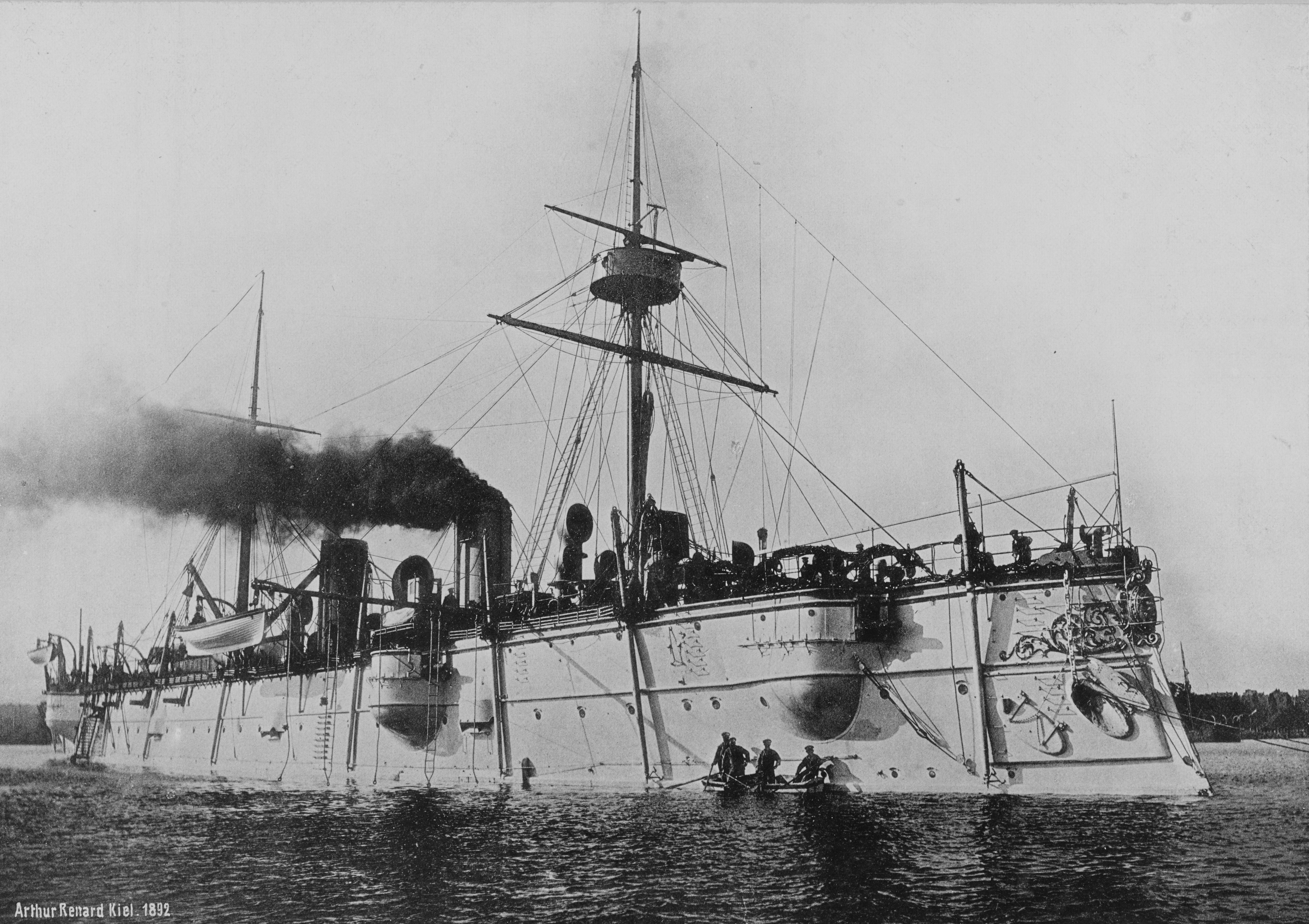
Irene in 1892

=== Construction and early career ===
Irene was the first protected cruiser built by the German navy. She was ordered under the contract name "Ersatz Elisabeth", (Note: German warships were ordered under provisional names. Additions to the fleet were given a single letter; ships intended to replace older or lost vessels were ordered as "Ersatz (name of the ship to be replaced)".) and was laid down at the AG Vulcan shipyard in Stettin in May 1886. Shortly after the ship's keel laying, the navy decided that she would be named after Princess Irene, the wife of Prince Heinrich. She was launched on 23 July 1887, and in January 1888, she was towed from Stettin to Kiel, arriving on 31 January. There, fitting-out work and installation of her guns was carried out. She was commissioned to begin sea trials on 25 May 1888, which were interrupted that summer when Irene joined the fleet that steamed to Great Britain to celebrate the ascension of Kaiser Wilhelm II. She was assigned to the I Division, along with the ironclad corvettes Sachsen and Baden and the casemate ironclad Oldenburg. Heinrich commanded the division, his flag flying in Irene. The fleet then held training maneuvers in the North Sea under command of Konteradmiral (KAdm—Rear Admiral) Friedrich von Hollmann. Irene completed her trials on 28 November, after which she was decommissioned for improvements to be made, which lasted into 1889.

The ship was recommissioned again on 1 April 1889 for her first period of regular service. At the end of May, she was assigned to the Maneuver Squadron. In August, the squadron made another visit to Britain. On 10 September, she went on another overseas cruise, this time to the Mediterranean Sea, where she met the Training Squadron, which was escorting the Kaiser's yacht Hohenzollern. The ships then visited Greece, to represent Germany at the ceremonies surrounding the marriage of Wilhelm's sister Sophie to Prince Constantine on 28 October. From there, the ships sailed to Constantinople in the Ottoman Empire, where Heinrich and Wilhelm visited Sultan Abdul Hamid II. After that, Irene sailed to Venice, Italy, after which she left the rest of the division and cruised alone starting on 14 November. The ship next stopped at the island of Corfu in Greece, before proceeding south to visit Ottoman Egypt, followed by Ottoman Syria. Irene thereafter rejoined the Training Squadron, which returned to Germany in April 1890. After returning, Irene was repainted white (instead of the normal black paint German warships received at the time), as she was to spend much of the rest of the year escorting Wilhelm's yacht.

Irene spent much of 1890 in the Training Squadron, though by this time the unit had been renamed as II Division of the Maneuver Fleet. She did not take part in training exercises over the summer, however, and instead continued to escort the Kaiser aboard Hohenzollern. In late June, the two ships sailed to Helsingør, Denmark, where Wilhelm met the Danish king, Christian IX. They then steamed north to Christiania to visit King Oscar II of Sweden–Norway. Irene escorted Wilhelm to Bremen to visit the city, after which the Kaiser made a state visit to Belgium to meet with Leopold II on 2 and 3 August. The two ships thereafter steamed to Britain to participate in the Cowes Regatta; this was the first time Wilhelm attended the regatta. Directly thereafter, the two ships steamed to the island of Helgoland to celebrate the ceremonial transfer from Britain; there, the entire German fleet joined Irene and Hohenzollern for the ceremonies. Irene then sailed with Hohenzollern to St. Petersburg, Russia, for a state visit with Tsar Alexander III from 14 to 27 August. After returning to Germany, Irene joined II Division for the annual fleet maneuvers. She then sailed to Wilhelmshaven on 18 September, where she was decommissioned for the winter. The ship remained out of service until 1894, in part to be refitted with quick-firing guns of the same caliber of her original armament, but also because the German fleet suffered from chronic crew shortages and men could not be assembled to recommission the ship.

=== East Asia Squadron ===
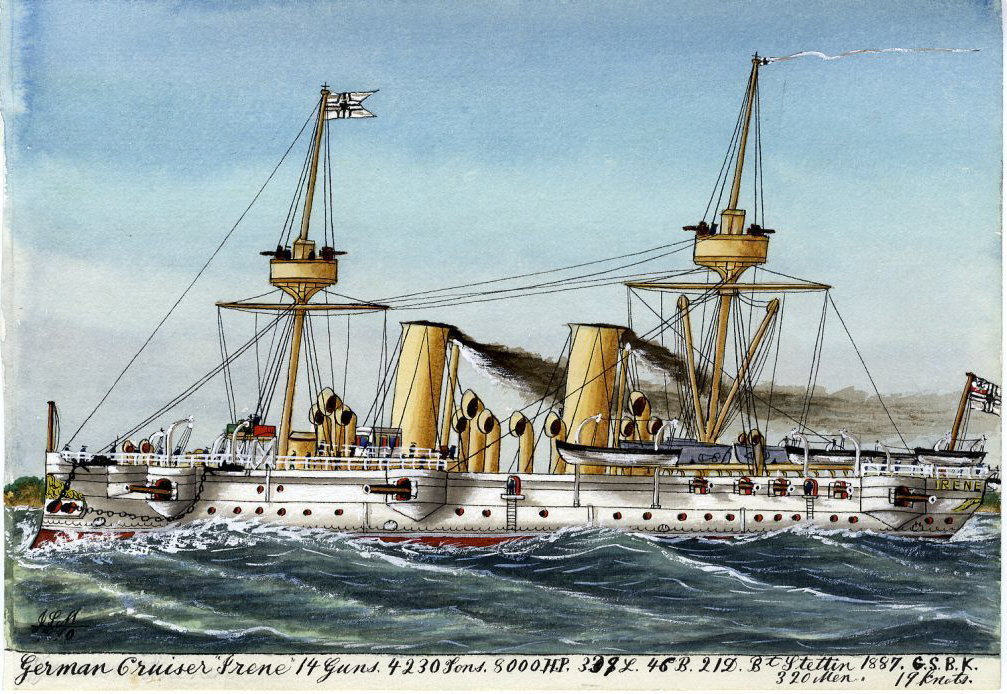
SMS Irene at full steam

==== 1894–1897 ====
The outbreak of the First Sino-Japanese War in June 1894 led the major European powers to strengthen their forces in East Asia. The German fleet at that time still relied on old screw corvettes for overseas cruiser duties; Irene and her sister ship Prinzess Wilhelm were the only modern cruisers in the fleet, so Irene was recommissioned on 1 November to serve in the newly created East Asia Division. Korvettenkapitän (KK—Corvette Captain) Erich von Dresky took command of the ship at that time; he would command the ship until May 1896. The ship got underway on 17 November 1894, but while en route to Asia, she was diverted to Morocco. She stopped in Casablanca to protest the murder of a German businessman in the city. She then proceeded on to Asian waters to join the German squadron; upon arrival in Chefoo on 14 February 1895, she became the flagship of KAdm Paul Hoffmann. At that time, the squadron also included the screw corvettes Arcona, Marie, and Alexandrine and the gunboats Wolf and Iltis.

Irene sailed to Hong Kong, stopping in Formosa on 20 April on the way. While at Formosa, the ship sent a landing party ashore in response to a minor battle between Iltis and a Chinese coastal fort there. In late June, Marie and Wolf left the division and their replacement, Prinzess Wilhelm arrived soon after. By that time, Japanese forces had completed their conquest of Formosa, permitting Irene to steam to the city of Taipei to withdraw her landing party. In July, the rebuilt old ironclad Kaiser arrived in East Asia, and on 10 July she replaced Irene as the division flagship. Later that year, they were joined by the unprotected cruiser Cormoran; Arcona and Iltis remained in the unit as well. In August, Irene cruised to northern Japan, visiting the port of Hakodate. The rest of the year passed uneventfully for the ship.

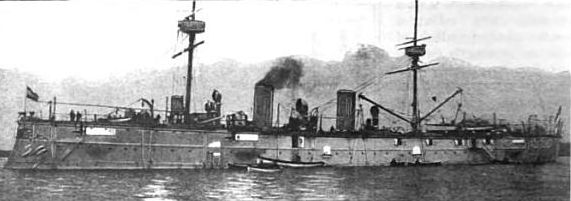
Irene at anchor

Irene spent the period from late May to mid-August at Chefoo, and during this period, KAdm Alfred von Tirpitz replaced Hoffmann as the divisional commander. After departing Chefoo, Irene went on a tour of the northern East Asian ports, including the Russian port at Vladivostok. She thereafter returned to Hong Kong for a lengthy overhaul. In late 1896, Tirpitz came aboard the ship to visit the Spanish Philippines. By that time, the Philippine Revolution had broken out against the Spanish colonial government, and the major powers had taken a keen interest on developments in the islands. Tirpitz determined that the fighting did not threaten German interests in the colony, and so he departed with Irene in January 1897, returning to Hong Kong. There, she joined the rest of the division, which cruised together through March. While the division was visiting Japan, Tirpitz received orders to return home to become the new State Secretary of the Reichsmarineamt (Imperial Naval Office).

==== Seizure of Jiaozhou and the Spanish-American War ====
The East Asia Division led by Irene (center)

In June 1897, Otto von Diederichs arrived in Asia to command the Cruiser Division; he first took the squadron to visit ports in northern Japan. While in Hakotade, he transferred to Irene to cross the Sea of Japan to Vladvostock. Diederichs spent the rest of the year reconnoitering the region for a suitable naval base. In late October, Irene had to put into Hong Kong for extensive engine maintenance, which was completed on 30 November. She rejoined the fleet on 3 December. In the meantime, Diederichs had completed the seizure of the Jiaozhou Bay Leased Territory; the Cruiser Division was sent reinforcements and promoted to the East Asia Squadron. Irene was assigned to I Division of the squadron. Irene joined the rest of the unit there on 2 December. In mid-April 1898, Irene was sent to receive periodic maintenance (though the location is disputed; according to the historians Hans Hildebrand, Albert Röhr, and Hans-Otto Steinmetz, Irene was sent to Nagasaki, Japan, for the work, while Terrell Gottschall states that the ship went to Shanghai. In any event, the ship was soon recalled, following the outbreak of the Spanish–American War, which implicated the Spanish colony in the Philippines.

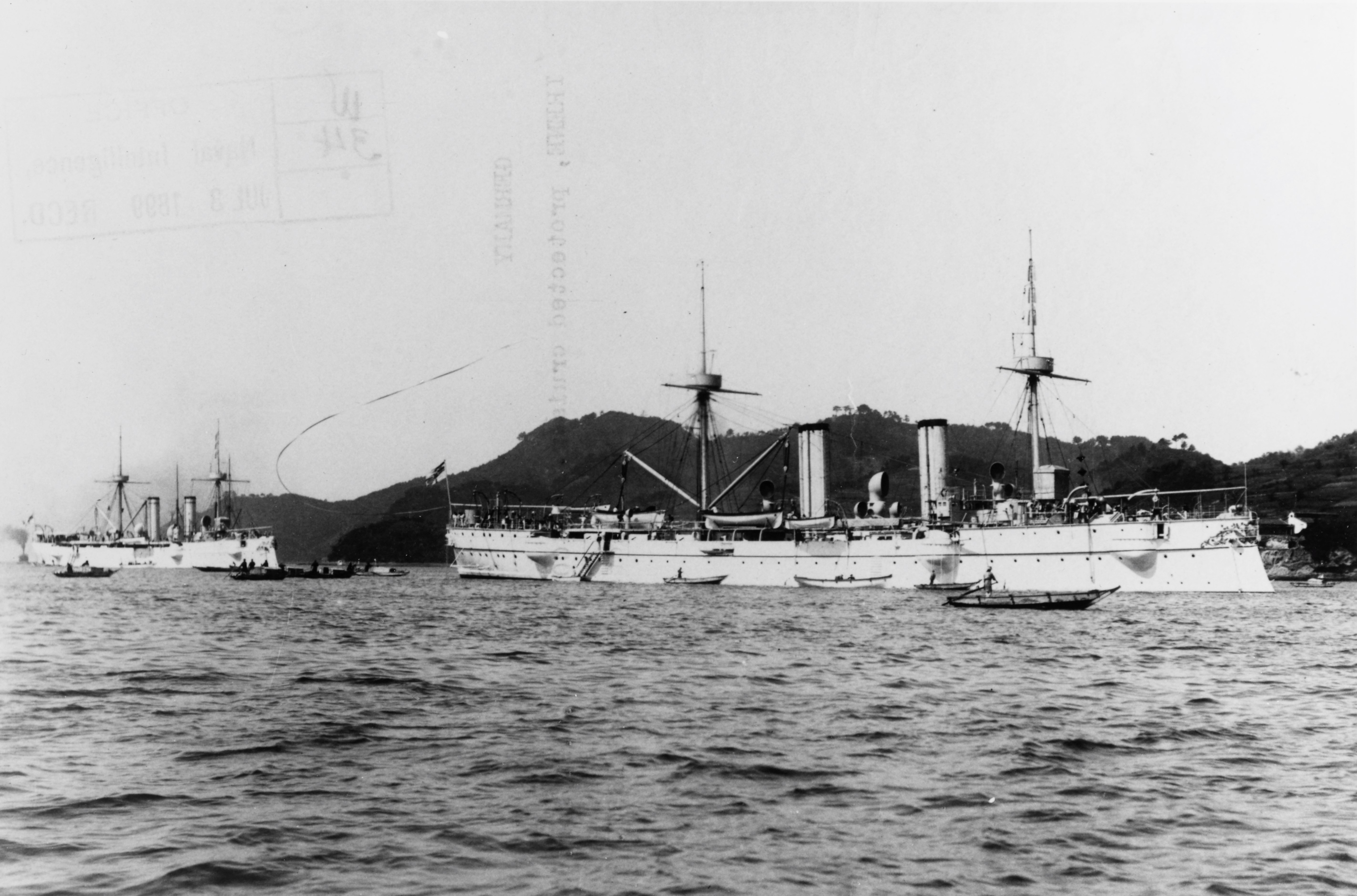
Irene and Prinzess Wilhelm (astern)

Irene steamed to Manila in the Philippines in the aftermath of the Battle of Manila Bay; she arrived in the harbor on 6 May. By 27 June, Irene had been joined by several other German warships, including Kaiserin Augusta, Diederichs's flagship. On the 27th, Irene was steaming into Manila Bay when she was stopped by the American revenue cutter USRC McCulloch. On 5 July, Diederichs dispatched Irene to survey Subic Bay and to evacuate any German nationals in the area that were threatened by Filipino insurgents. While steaming off Isla Grande, Irene encountered the rebel ship Companie de Filipinas, which was threatening the Spanish garrison at Isla Grande. The rebel commander came aboard Irene to inform her captain of his activities; Captain August Obenheimer, Irene's commanding officer, informed him that any act of war committed under the rebel flag was an act of piracy under international law. The rebels therefore agreed to return to port. Obenheimer inspected both the Spanish garrison on the island and the nearby rebel base in Olongapo. After unsuccessfully searching for German nationals in the area, Irene evacuated the noncombatants on Isla Grande on 7 July; while steaming out of Subic Bay, Irene encountered the American warships Raleigh and Concord without issue.

The American press exaggerated the encounter between Irene and the American ships, which prompted Diederichs to decide to send Irene away from the area to deflate tensions between the two countries. After returning to Manila and debarking the non-combatants, Irene was ordered to depart the Philippines. Irene relieved Arcona in Qingdao in the Jiaozhou concession, which was in turn ordered to steam to the Caroline and Mariana Islands to observe the American capture of Guam. Irene coaled in Mariveles before departing for Qingdao on 9 July. While in Qingdao, Irene conducted crew training. In October, Irene departed for Nagasaki for the overhaul that had been deferred earlier in the year. After completing her maintenance, she returned to Manila in November, but remained there only briefly, before she was replaced by Kaiserin Augusta. In mid-February 1899, Irene departed the Philippines and returned to the Chinese coast. In June, the ship went on a cruise to Korean and Russian waters without incident, before returning to Qingdao. On 24 October, she departed to visit Nagasaki, where she was drydocked for maintenance. In November, Fregattenkapitän (Frigate Captain) Johannes Stein became the ship's commander.

==== Boxer Rebellion and return to Germany ====
Work on the ship lasted until 1 January 1900. By that time, the squadron had received several new ships, and it now also included the protected cruisers Hertha, Hansa, and Kaiserin Augusta, and the unprotected cruiser Gefion. The five cruisers rendezvoused in Qingdao on 23 April for squadron training exercises that lasted into early May. The ships then dispersed for cruises through the region, but later that month, the ships all returned to Qingdao. Around that time, the Germans received word of the outbreak of the Boxer Uprising in China. The Europeans in the region were not initially concerned with the unrest, but as the situation worsened, the British Vice Admiral Edward Seymour, the longest-serving vice admiral in the area, contacted the other European naval commanders and requested a meeting to discuss what measures should be taken. Bendemann ordered his squadron, less Irene, which was to remain behind to guard Qingdao, to meet the ships of the British China Station off Taku at the mouth of the Hai River. Irene was the oldest vessel in the German squadron, so she was ordered to guard the port. She did, however, contribute a landing party to the Seymour Expedition that was to relieve the Siege of the International Legations in Beijing. The expedition was attacked and defeated on the way to Beijing and was forced to withdraw to Tianjin; twelve men from Irene were killed during the operation.

In late June, Irene carried two companies of III. Seebataillons (Naval Battalion) from Qingdao to replace the landing parties at Tianjin. She thereafter returned to Qingdao, where she remained for the rest of the year, interrupted only once, by a four-week cruise into the Yangtze river in October. She spent the rest of her time in East Asia on cruises in the Yellow Sea. In late June 1901, the Boxer Uprising had finally been defeated, and on 27 June, Irene departed for Germany in company with Gefion. The two cruisers arrived in Wilhelmshaven on 22 September, and Irene continued on to Danzig, where she was decommissioned on 1 October. According to the historians Hans Hildebrand, Albert Röhr, and Hans-Otto Steinmetz, and Erich Gröner, Irene was modernized at the Kaiserliche Werft (Imperial Shipyard) in Wilhelmshaven from 1903 to 1905. But the historian Dirk Nottelmann, writing in 2023, states that earlier publications were incorrect, and the modernization was only carried out for Prinzess Wilhelm, not Irene. All agree that the ship was used as a barracks ship for U-boat crews based in Kiel beginning in December 1913 and that she was struck from the naval register on 17 February 1914. In 1916, during World War I, she was moved to Wilhelmshaven, where she filled the same role until the end of the war in November 1918. She was eventually sold to ship breakers on 26 November 1921 and dismantled in Wilhelmshaven.
