= 10.5 cm SK L/35 =

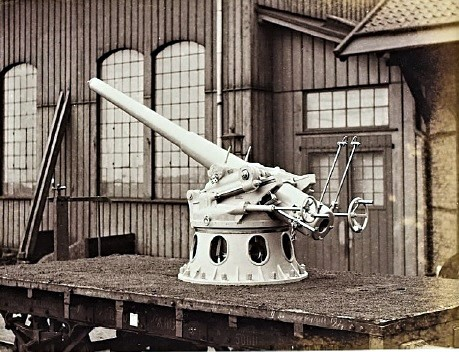
- A 10.5 cm SK L/35 on a Vavasseur mounting.
- Type: Naval gun
- Place of origin: German Empire

Service history
- Used by: German Empire; The Netherlands; Ottoman Empire; Spain
- Wars: World War I

Production history
- Designer: Krupp
- Designed: 1891
- Manufacturer: Krupp
- Produced: 1894

Specifications
- Mass: 1,270 kg (2,800 lb)
- Length: 3.6 m (11 ft 10 in) 35 caliber
- Barrel length: 3.4 m (11 ft 2 in)
- Calibre: 105 millimeters (4.1 in)
- Breech: Horizontal sliding-wedge breech
- Elevation: -10° to +30°
- Traverse: 360°
- Rate of fire: 7.5 rpm
- Muzzle velocity: 600 m/s (2,000 ft/s)
- Effective firing range: 12 km (7.5 mi) at +30°

The 10.5 cm SK L/35 (SK - Schnelladekanone (quick-loading cannon) L - Länge (with a 35-caliber long barrel) was a German naval gun developed in the years before World War I that armed a variety of warships of the Imperial German Navy during World War I. In addition to the Imperial German Navy the 10.5 cm SK L/35 was used by the Royal Netherlands Navy, Ottoman Navy and Spanish Navy.

== Naval Use ==
The 10.5 cm SK L/35 was used as primary or secondary armament aboard corvettes, gunboats, pre-dreadnought battleships, protected cruisers, torpedo gunboats, and unprotected cruisers.

Ships armed with the 10.5 cm SK L/35 include:

- Brandenburg-class battleships
- Bussard-class cruisers
- Carola-class corvettes
- Irene-class cruisers
- Koetei-class gunboats
- Peleng-i Deryâ-class torpedo gunboats

== Ammunition ==
Ammunition was 105 x 656 mm R and of fixed QF type. A complete round weighed 21.4 kg (47 lb). The projectiles weighed 14 kg (31 lb).

The gun was able to fire:

- Armor Piercing
- High Explosive

== Weapons of comparable role, performance and era ==
- 10.5 cm SK L/40 naval gun : Successor to the SK L/35
- 4"/40 caliber gun : American equivalent
- Canon de 100 mm Modèle 1891 : French equivalent
- Cannon 102/35 Model 1914 : Italian equivalent
- QF 4 inch naval gun Mk I – III : British equivalent
