= HMS Minotaur (1906) =

British lead ship of the Minotaur-class

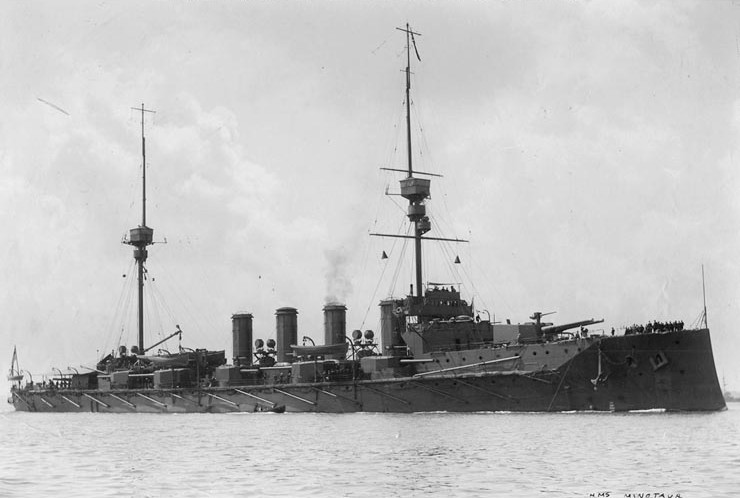
- Minotaur underway with her original short funnels

History

United Kingdom
- Name: Minotaur
- Namesake: Minotaur
- Builder: Devonport Dockyard
- Laid down: 2 January 1905
- Launched: 6 June 1906
- Commissioned: 1 April 1908
- Decommissioned: 5 February 1919
- Fate: Sold for scrap, April 1920

General characteristics
- Class & type: Minotaur-class armoured cruiser
- Displacement: 14,600 long tons (14,800 t)
- Length: 490 ft (149.4 m) between perpendiculars; 519 ft (158.2 m) overall
- Beam: 74.5 ft (22.7 m)
- Draught: 26 ft (7.9 m)
- Installed power: 27,000 ihp (20,130 kW); 24 × Yarrow water-tube boilers
- Propulsion: 2 × shafts; 2 × Vertical triple-expansion steam engines
- Speed: 23 kn (43 km/h; 26 mph)
- Range: 8,150 nmi (15,090 km; 9,380 mi) at 10 kn (19 km/h; 12 mph)
- Complement: 825 (1909)
- Armament: 2 × twin BL 9.2-inch Mk XI guns; 10 × single BL 7.5-inch Mk V guns; 16 × single QF 12-pounder, 18 cwt guns; 5 × 18-inch (450 mm) torpedo tubes (Note: British "18-inch" torpedoes were 17.72 inches (45.0 cm) in diameter)
- Armour: Belt: 3–6 in (8–15 cm); Deck: 1.5–2 in (4–5 cm); Barbettes: 7 in (18 cm); Gun turrets: 4.5–8 in (11–20 cm); Conning tower: 10 in (25 cm)

HMS Minotaur was the lead ship of the Minotaur-class armoured cruisers built for the Royal Navy. Launched in 1906, she served as the flagship of the China Station before the First World War. Shortly after the war began, the ship searched unsuccessfully for the German East Asia Squadron and was transferred to the Grand Fleet at the end of 1914. During the rest of the war Minotaur served as the flagship of the 7th and 2nd Cruiser Squadrons and spent most of her time assigned to the Northern Patrol. In mid-1916 she participated in the Battle of Jutland but did not fire her weapons during the battle. The ship was paid off in 1919 and sold for scrap the following year.

== Description ==
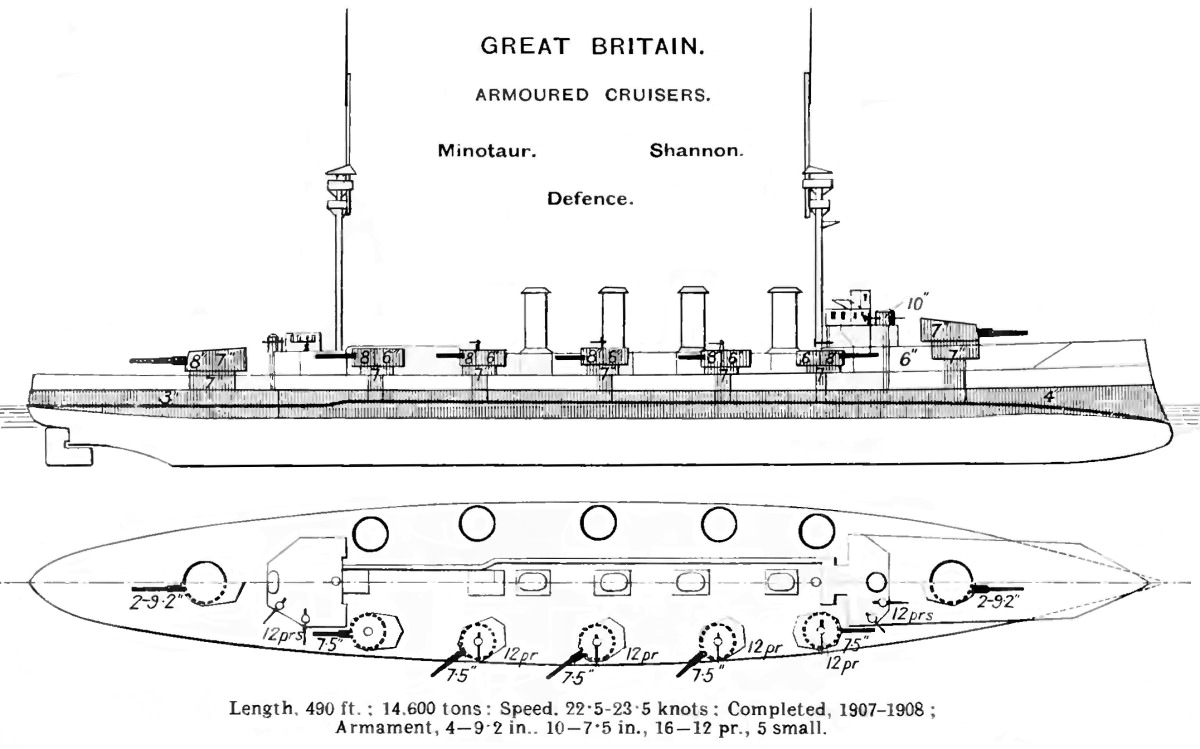
Right elevation and deck plan as depicted in Brassey's Naval Annual 1912. The shaded areas represent her armour.

Minotaur displaced 14,600 long tons (14,800 t) as built and 16,630 long tons (16,900 t) at deep load. The ship had an overall length of 519 feet (158.2 m), a beam of 74 feet 6 inches (22.7 m) and a mean draught of 26 feet (7.9 m). She was powered by a pair of four-cylinder triple-expansion steam engines, each driving one shaft, which developed a total of 27,000 indicated horsepower (20,130 kW) and gave a maximum speed of 23 knots (43 km/h; 26 mph). The engines were powered by 24 Yarrow water-tube boilers. The ship carried a maximum of 2,060 long tons (2,090 t) of coal and an additional 750 long tons (760 t) of fuel oil that was sprayed on the coal to increase its burn rate. At full capacity, she could steam for 8,150 nautical miles (15,090 km; 9,380 mi) at a speed of 10 knots (19 km/h; 12 mph). Minotaur was designed to carry 779 officers and men, but mustered 825 in 1909.

The ship's main armament consisted of four BL 9.2-inch Mark X guns in two twin-gun turrets, one each fore and aft. Her secondary armament, ten BL 7.5-inch Mark II guns, were mounted amidships in single turrets. Anti-torpedo boat defence was provided by sixteen QF 12-pounder (three-inch) 18-cwt guns. (Note: "Cwt" is the abbreviation for hundredweight, 18 cwt referring to the weight of the gun.) Minotaur also mounted five submerged 18-inch torpedo tubes, one of which was mounted in the stern.

The waterline belt consisted of 6 inches (152 mm) of Krupp cemented armour roughly between the fore and aft 7.5-inch gun turrets, but was reduced in steps to three inches to the ends of the ship. The gun turrets and barbettes were protected by 6–8 in (152–203 mm) of armour. The thickness of the lower deck was 1.5–2 inches (38–51 mm). The armour of the conning tower was 10 inches (254 mm) thick.

== Construction and career ==
Minotaur was ordered as part of the 1904–05 naval construction programme as the last of three Minotaur-class armoured cruisers. She was laid down on 2 January 1905 at Devonport Royal Dockyard and was christened on 6 June 1907 by the Countess of Crewe. The ship suffered a coal gas explosion that injured three sailors and one dockyard worker on 6 November before she was commissioned on 1 April 1908. Minotaur cost £1,410,356. The ship was assigned to the 5th Cruiser Squadron of the Home Fleet upon commissioning. She escorted the royal yacht Victoria and Albert from Kiel, Germany to Reval when King Edward VII and his wife visited in Russia in June. The next month Minotaur escorted the battlecruiser Indomitable as it carried the Prince of Wales to Canada to commemorate the tercentenary of Quebec City. The ship was transferred to the 1st Cruiser Squadron when the Home Fleet reorganized on 24 March 1909. She was present for two fleet reviews in June and July before she was ordered to the China Station in January 1910 to relieve King Alfred as flagship.

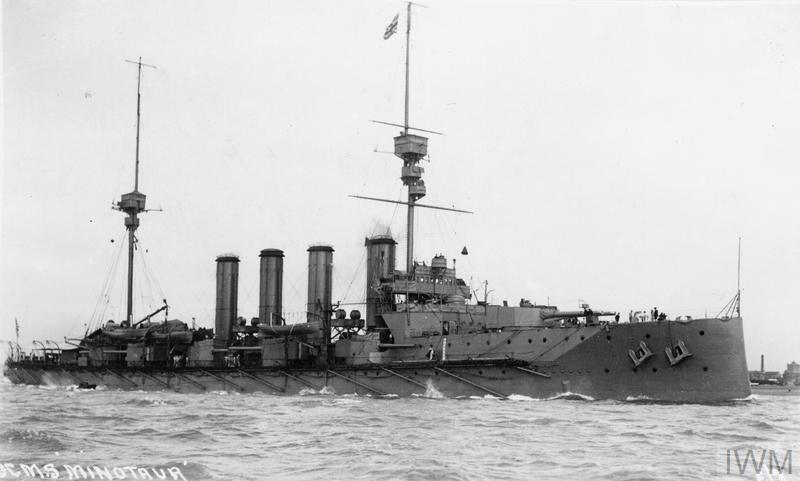
Minotaur with tall funnels

Minotaur was in Wei Hai Wei on 3 July 1914 when most of the ships assigned to the China Station were ordered to assemble at Hong Kong. Shortly after the start of the First World War, the ship, together with the armoured cruiser Hampshire and the light cruiser Newcastle sailed for the German-owned island of Yap. They captured the collier Elsbeth on 11 August and destroyed the radio station there with gunfire. They then unsuccessfully searched for the ships of the East Asia Squadron until the light cruiser Emden was reported to have destroyed several ships in the Bay of Bengal in mid-September. Minotaur was ordered to the west coast of Sumatra to search for the German warship, but was unsuccessful. She was then ordered to escort a troop convoy from Wellington, New Zealand in late September. The ship was detached from the convoy and ordered to proceed to the Cape of Good Hope and reinforce the squadron there on 6 November after the Admiralty learned of the defeat at the Battle of Coronel. Upon her arrival Minotaur became flagship of the Cape of Good Hope Station under the command of Vice Admiral Herbert King-Hall and escorted a South African troop convoy to Luderitz Bay in German South-West Africa. The ship was near Table Bay, South Africa when the East Asia Squadron was destroyed during the Battle of the Falklands in early December and she was ordered home on 8 December.

Upon her arrival, Minotaur became flagship of the 7th Cruiser Squadron, under the command of Rear Admiral Arthur Waymouth, based at Cromarty Firth. She received a brief refit in early 1915 and was then assigned to Northern Patrol for the next year. The ship received a QF 12-pounder (three-inch) 12-cwt anti-aircraft (AA) gun and a QF three-pounder (47 mm) AA gun in 1915–16. The 12-pounder gun was mounted on the aft superstructure and the three-pounder on the quarterdeck at the extreme rear. The ship was transferred to the 2nd Cruiser Squadron on 30 May 1916 and participated in the Battle of Jutland on the following day as flagship of Rear Admiral Herbert Heath. She remained unengaged throughout the battle and did not fire her 9.2 or 7.5-inch guns at all during the battle. Minotaur was also present during the attempted interception of the High Seas Fleet by the Grand Fleet on 19 August although no combat occurred. For the rest of the war, the ship was assigned to the Northern Patrol. On 11 December 1917, together with her sister Shannon and four destroyers, she was assigned to patrol the convoy route between Lerwick and Norway, but the Germans successfully destroyed a convoy off the Norwegian coast on the following day and returned home without being spotted. The British ships were only able to rescue survivors and escort the sole surviving ship from the convoy, the crippled destroyer Pellew, back to Scapa Flow.

In 1917–18 the 12-pounder AA gun mounted on the aft superstructure was moved to the roof of the forward 9.2-inch gun turret and a fire-control system was installed with a director mounted on a platform fitted to the foremast. Minotaur was paid off on 5 February 1919, placed on the disposal list in May, put up for sale in March 1920 and sold the following month.

== Bibliography ==
- Burt, R. A. (1987). "Minotaur: Before the Battlecruiser". Warship. 42. Conway Maritime Press: 83–95. ISSN 0142-6222.
- Campbell, John (1998). Jutland: An Analysis of the Fighting. Conway Maritime Press. ISBN 1-55821-759-2.
- Corbett, Julian (1997) [1938]. Naval Operations to the Battle of the Falklands. History of the Great War: Based on Official Documents. Vol. I (2nd ed.). Imperial War Museum and Battery Press. ISBN 0-89839-256-X.
- Corbett, Julian (1997) [1929]. Naval Operations. History of the Great War: Based on Official Documents. Vol. II (2nd ed.). Imperial War Museum in association with the Battery Press. ISBN 1-870423-74-7.
- Corbett, Julian (1997) [1940]. Naval Operations. History of the Great War: Based on Official Documents. Vol. III (2nd ed.). Imperial War Museum in association with the Battery Press. ISBN 1-870423-50-X.
- Dixon, John (2008). A Clash of Empires (1st ed.). Bridge Books. ISBN 978-1-84494-052-3.
- Newbolt, Henry (1996) [1928]. Naval Operations. History of the Great War Based on Official Documents. Vol. IV. Battery Press. ISBN 0-89839-253-5.
- Newbolt, Henry (1996) [1931]. Naval Operations. History of the Great War Based on Official Documents. Vol. V. Battery Press. ISBN 0-89839-255-1.
- Parkes, Oscar (1990) [1966]. British Battleships, Warrior 1860 to Vanguard 1950: A History of Design, Construction, and Armament (New & rev. ed.). Naval Institute Press. ISBN 1-55750-075-4.
