= HMS Shannon (1906) =

British Minotaur-class armoured cruiser

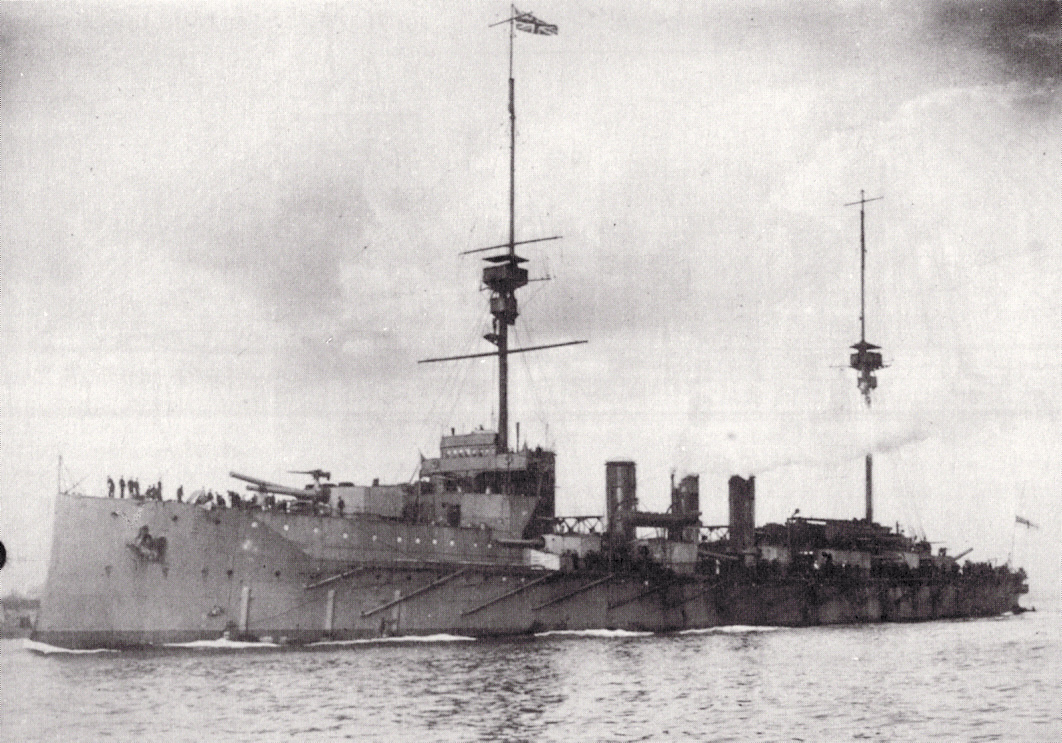
- Shannon with short funnels (1908–09)

History

United Kingdom
- Name: Shannon
- Builder: Chatham Dockyard
- Laid down: 2 January 1905
- Launched: 20 September 1906
- Completed: November 1907 (for trials)
- Commissioned: 19 March 1908
- Decommissioned: 2 May 1919
- Fate: Sold for scrap, 12 December 1922

General characteristics
- Class & type: Minotaur-class armoured cruiser
- Displacement: 14,600 long tons (14,800 t)
- Length: 519 ft (158.2 m) (overall)
- Beam: 75.5 ft (23.0 m)
- Draught: 26 ft (7.9 m) (mean)
- Installed power: 24 Yarrow boilers; 27,000 ihp (20,000 kW)
- Propulsion: 2 shafts; 2 triple-expansion steam engines
- Speed: 22 knots (41 km/h; 25 mph)
- Range: 8,150 nmi (15,090 km; 9,380 mi) at 10 knots (19 km/h; 12 mph)
- Complement: 842 (1912)
- Armament: 2 × twin BL 9.2-inch Mk XI guns; 10 × single BL 7.5-inch Mk V guns; 16 × single QF 12-pounder, 18 cwt guns; 5 × 18-inch (450 mm) torpedo tubes (Note: British "18-inch" torpedoes were 17.72 inches (45.0 cm) in diameter.)
- Armour: Belt: 3–6 in (76–152 mm); Deck: 1.5–2 in (38–51 mm); Barbettes: 7 in (178 mm); Gun turrets: 4.5–8 in (114–203 mm); Conning tower: 10 in (254 mm)

HMS Shannon was a Minotaur-class armoured cruiser built for the Royal Navy in the mid-1900s. Before the First World War, she served with the Home Fleet, generally as the flagship of a cruiser squadron. The ship remained with the Grand Fleet, as the Home Fleet was renamed when the war began, for the entire war, but only participated in a single battle, the Battle of Jutland in May 1916. Shannon spent most of the war patrolling the North Sea for German warships and commerce raiders. She was paid off in 1919 and sold for scrap in 1922.

== Description ==
Shannon displaced 14,600 long tons (14,800 t) as built and 16,630 long tons (16,900 t) at deep load. The ship had an overall length of 519 feet (158.2 m), a beam of 75 feet 6 inches (23.0 m) and a mean draught of 26 feet (7.9 m). Her beam was 1 foot (0.3 m) wider and her draught one foot less than her sisters in the belief that she would prove to be the fastest ship in the class. Shannon was powered by a pair of four-cylinder triple-expansion steam engines, each driving one shaft, using steam provided by 24 Yarrow water-tube boilers. The engines were designed to reach a total of 27,000 indicated horsepower (20,000 kW) and were intended to give a maximum speed of 23 knots (43 km/h; 26 mph). Shannon proved to be the slowest ship in the class; during her sea trials on 3 December 1907 her engines reached 29,644 indicated horsepower (22,106 kW), but she only reached a speed of 22.592 knots (41.8 km/h; 26.0 mph) The ship carried a maximum of 2,060 long tons (2,090 t) of coal and an additional 750 long tons (760 t) of fuel oil that was sprayed on the coal to increase its burn rate. At full capacity, she could steam for 8,150 nautical miles (15,090 km; 9,380 mi) at a speed of 10 knots (19 km/h; 12 mph). Shannon was designed to carry 779 officers and ratings, but had a complement of 819 in 1908 and 842 in 1912.

The ship's main armament consisted of four BL 9.2-inch Mark XI guns in two twin-gun turrets, one each fore and aft. Her secondary armament of ten BL 7.5-inch Mark II guns were mounted amidships in single turrets. Anti-torpedo boat defence was provided by sixteen QF 12-pounder (3-inch) 18-cwt guns. (Note: "Cwt" is the abbreviation for hundredweight, 18 cwt referring to the weight of the gun.) Shannon also mounted five submerged 17.7-inch torpedo tubes, one of which was mounted in the stern.

The waterline armour belt consisted of 6 inches (152 mm) of Krupp cemented armour roughly between the fore and aft 7.5-inch gun turrets, but was reduced in steps to three inches to the ends of the ship. The gun turrets and barbettes were protected by 6–8 inches (152–203 mm) of armour. The thickness of the lower deck was 1.5–2 inches (38–51 mm). The armour of the conning tower was 10 inches (254 mm) thick.

== Construction and career ==
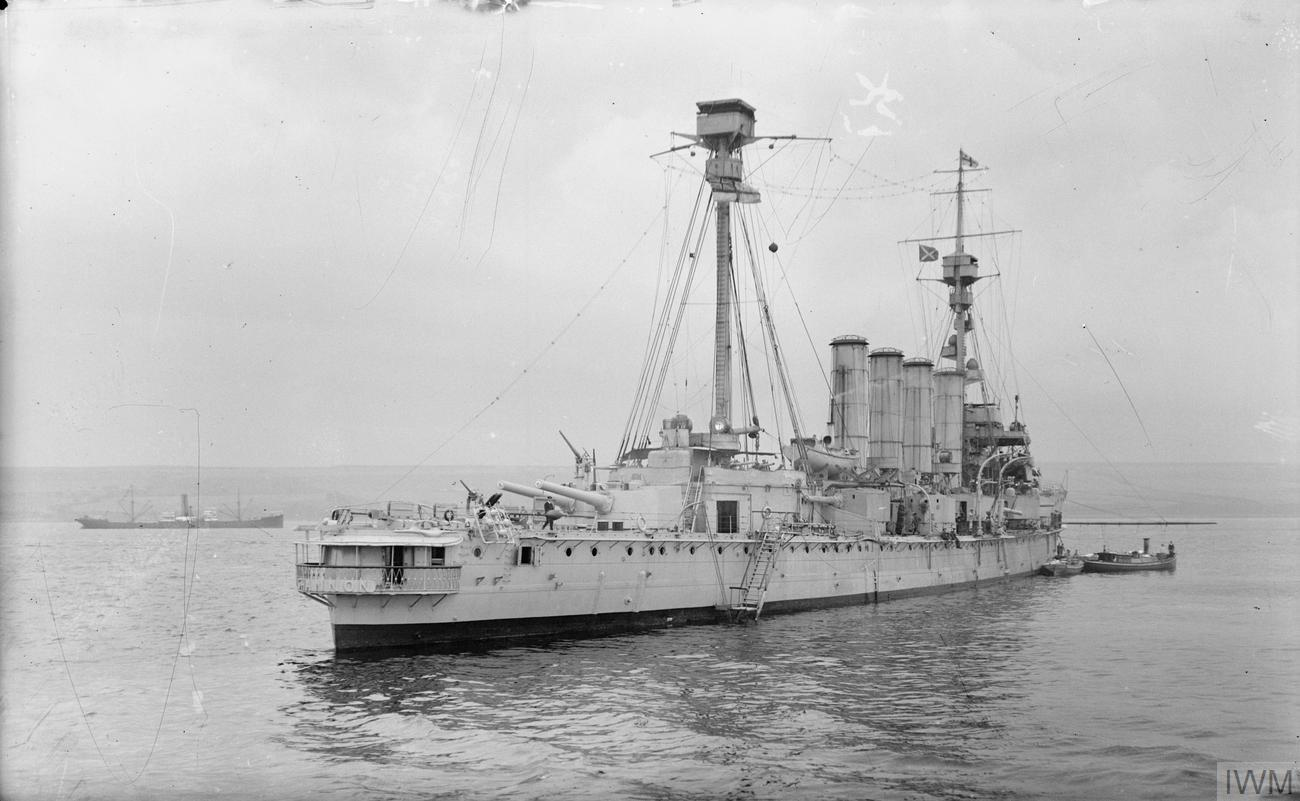
Shannon after her funnels were lengthened.

Shannon was ordered as part of the 1904–05 naval construction programme as one of the three Minotaur-class armoured cruisers. She was laid down on 2 January 1905 at Chatham Dockyard. The ship was christened on 27 April 1907 by Lady Carrington and commissioned on 19 March 1908 at the cost of £1,415,135. While fitting out in Portsmouth, Shannon was accidentally struck on 5 December 1907 by the battleship Prince George which had broken loose from her anchorage; both ships were only lightly damaged.

Upon commissioning, the ship became the flagship of the 5th Cruiser Squadron of Home Fleet and was later transferred to the 2nd Cruiser Squadron as a private ship when the fleet reorganized in April 1909. She became the flagship of her squadron on 1 March 1910 and made a port visit to Torbay in January 1911. Shannon was relieved as flagship by the battlecruiser Indomitable on 5 March 1912 and was transferred to the 3rd Cruiser Squadron as that squadron's flagship. In January 1914, she relieved Indomitable as flagship of the 2nd Cruiser Squadron during exercises off the northwest coast of Spain. The following month, Shannon, together with the 1st Battlecruiser Squadron and the rest of the 2nd Cruiser Squadron, made a port visit to Brest, France.

In October 1914, the ship was patrolling off the coast of Norway and almost intercepted the armed merchant cruiser SS Berlin on several occasions. During a sweep into the Heligoland Bight on 26 November, she was unsuccessfully bombed by a German aircraft. She began a refit shortly afterwards that lasted until 24 January 1915. Shannon was present in Cromarty Firth when the armoured cruiser Natal's magazine exploded on 30 December 1915 and her crew attempted to rescue survivors from Natal. The ship received a QF 12-pounder (three-inch) 12-cwt anti-aircraft (AA) gun and a QF 3-pounder (47 mm) AA gun in 1915–16. The 12-pounder gun was mounted on the aft superstructure and the 3-pounder on the quarterdeck at the extreme rear. Sometime afterwards, a fire-control system was installed with a director mounted on a platform fitted to the foremast.

During the Battle of Jutland on 31 May 1916, she was on the unengaged side of the fleet and did not fire her 9.2 or 7.5-inch guns at all during the battle. The ship spent several days after the battle searching for survivors from her sister Defence and other sunken ships. Before the end of the war the 12-pounder AA gun mounted on the aft superstructure was moved to the roof of the forward 9.2-inch gun turret. Shannon was paid off on 2 May 1919 and became an accommodation ship until sold for breaking up on 12 December 1922.

== Notable commanding officers ==
- Charles Douglas Carpendale, 1912-1914
- John Saumarez Dumaresq
- Vincent Barkly Molteno
