= Minotaur-class cruiser (1906) =

British class of armoured cruisers

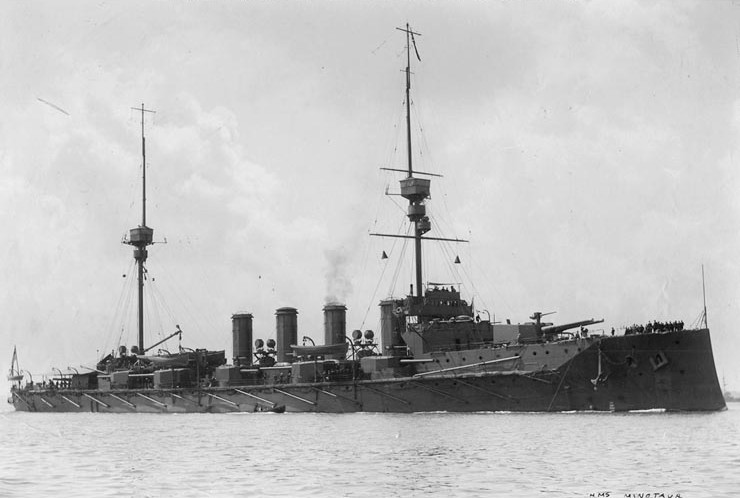
- Minotaur at anchor, shortly after she was completed

Class overview
- Name: Minotaur-class cruiser
- Operators: Royal Navy
- Preceded by: Warrior class
- Succeeded by: None
- Built: 1905–1909
- In commission: 1908–1919
- Planned: 4
- Completed: 3
- Canceled: 1
- Lost: 1
- Scrapped: 2

General characteristics
- Type: Armoured cruiser
- Displacement: 14,600 long tons (14,800 t)
- Length: 490 ft (149.4 m) (p/p); 519 ft (158.2 m) (o/a)
- Beam: 74.5 ft (22.7 m)
- Draught: 26 ft (7.9 m)
- Installed power: 24 Yarrow boilers; 27,000 ihp (20,000 kW)
- Propulsion: 2 shafts; 2 triple-expansion steam engines
- Speed: 23 knots (43 km/h; 26 mph)
- Range: 8,150 nmi (15,090 km; 9,380 mi) at 10 knots (19 km/h; 12 mph)
- Complement: 802
- Armament: 2 × twin 9.2 in (234 mm) guns; 10 × single 7.5 in (191 mm) guns; 16 × single QF 12-pounder (3 inch, 76 mm) 18-cwt guns (Note: "Cwt" is the abbreviation for hundredweight, 18 cwt referring to the weight of the gun.); 5 × submerged 18 in (450 mm) torpedo tubes
- Armour: Belt: 3–6 in (76–152 mm); Deck: 1.5–2 in (38–51 mm); Barbettes: 7 in (178 mm); Gun turrets: 4.5–8 in (114–203 mm); Conning tower: 10 in (254 mm)

The Minotaur class was a three-ship class of armoured cruisers built in the first decade of the twentieth century for the Royal Navy. These were the last class of armoured cruisers built for the Royal Navy, with that role being substantially replaced by the first battlecruisers. These initially served with the Home Fleet, generally as the flagships of cruiser squadrons. Minotaur became flagship of the China Station in 1910 and Defence served as flagship of the 1st Cruiser Squadron in the Mediterranean from 1912; Shannon remained at home as flagship of several different squadrons.

When World War I began in August 1914, Defence participated in the pursuit of the German ships SMS Goeben and SMS Breslau and Minotaur hunted for the German East Asia Squadron and German commerce raiders in the Pacific and Indian Oceans. Shannon remained with the Grand Fleet, as the Home Fleet was renamed, for the entire war. All three were present at the Battle of Jutland in May 1916, where Defence was sunk with the loss of all men on board. The surviving pair spent most of the rest of the war assigned to the Northern Patrol unsuccessfully searching for German warships and commerce raiders. The pair were scrapped after the war.

== Design and description ==
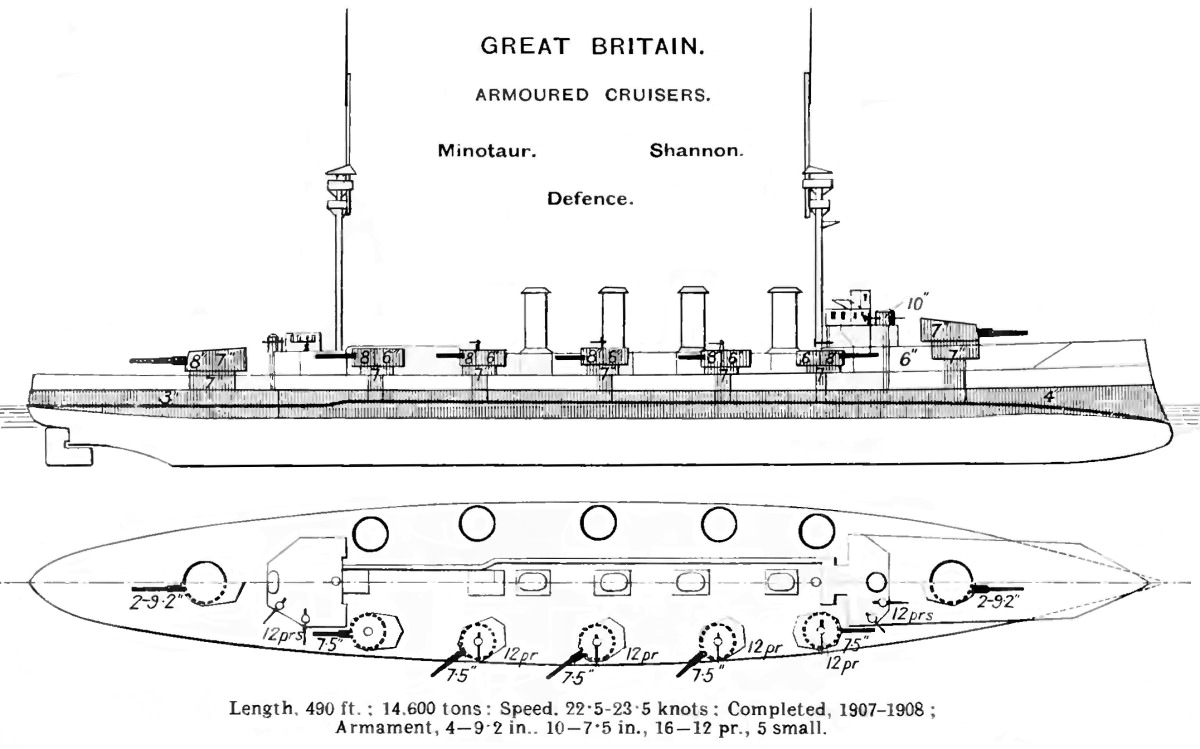
Right elevation and deck plan as depicted in Brassey's Naval Annual 1912. The shaded areas represent her armour.

The Minotaur-class ships were the last armoured cruisers built for the Royal Navy. They were significantly larger and more heavily armed than their predecessors, although their armour was reduced in an attempt to compensate for the additional weight of the armament. The design was criticized for this weakness as well as the wide dispersal of the 7.5-inch (191 mm) turrets along the length of the ship. They have been described by naval historian R. A. Burt as "cruiser editions of the Lord Nelson-class battleship", and by E.H.H. Archibald of the Greenwich National Maritime Museum as "armed in a manner that presented one of the most ferocious sights in the fleet". A planned fourth ship of the class, Orion, was cancelled due to financial pressures arising from the purchase of the Swiftsure-class battleships.

The Minotaur class displaced 14,600 long tons (14,800 t) as built and 16,630 long tons (16,900 t) at deep load. Defence and Minotaur had an overall length of 519 feet (158.2 m), a beam of 74 feet 6 inches (22.7 m) and a mean draught of 26 feet (7.9 m). Shannon had 1 foot (0.30 m) more beam and one foot less draught than her sister ships to evaluate the theory that she might be faster with these proportions than her sisters. The class displaced 1,050 long tons (1,070 t) more, was 13 feet 6 inches (4.11 m) longer overall, was one foot broader in beam and had more freeboard than their predecessors of the Duke of Edinburgh class. At normal load they had a metacentric height of 3.05 feet (0.9 m), and at deep load, 3.25 feet (1.0 m). The Minotaurs were designed to carry 779 officers and enlisted men, but mustered 802–842 between 1908 and 1912.

The ships were powered by a pair of four-cylinder triple-expansion steam engines, each driving one shaft, which developed a total of 27,000 indicated horsepower (20,130 kW) intended to give a maximum speed of 23 knots (43 km/h; 26 mph). The engines were powered by 24 water-tube boilers with a working pressure of 275 psi (1,896 kPa; 19 kgf/cm^{2}). They carried a maximum of 2,060 long tons (2,090 t) of coal and an additional 750 long tons (760 t) of fuel oil that was sprayed on the coal to increase its burn rate. At full capacity, the ships could steam for 8,150 nautical miles (15,090 km; 9,380 mi) at a speed of 10 knots (19 km/h; 12 mph). During her sea trials on 6 December 1907, Minotaur made her designed speed when she reached 23.01 knots from 27,049 ihp (20,170 kW) during her eight-hour full-power test. Shannon proved to be the slowest of the three and only reached 22.324 knots (41.344 km/h; 25.690 mph) from 27,372 ihp (20,411 kW) during her trial three days before Minotaur's.

=== Armament ===
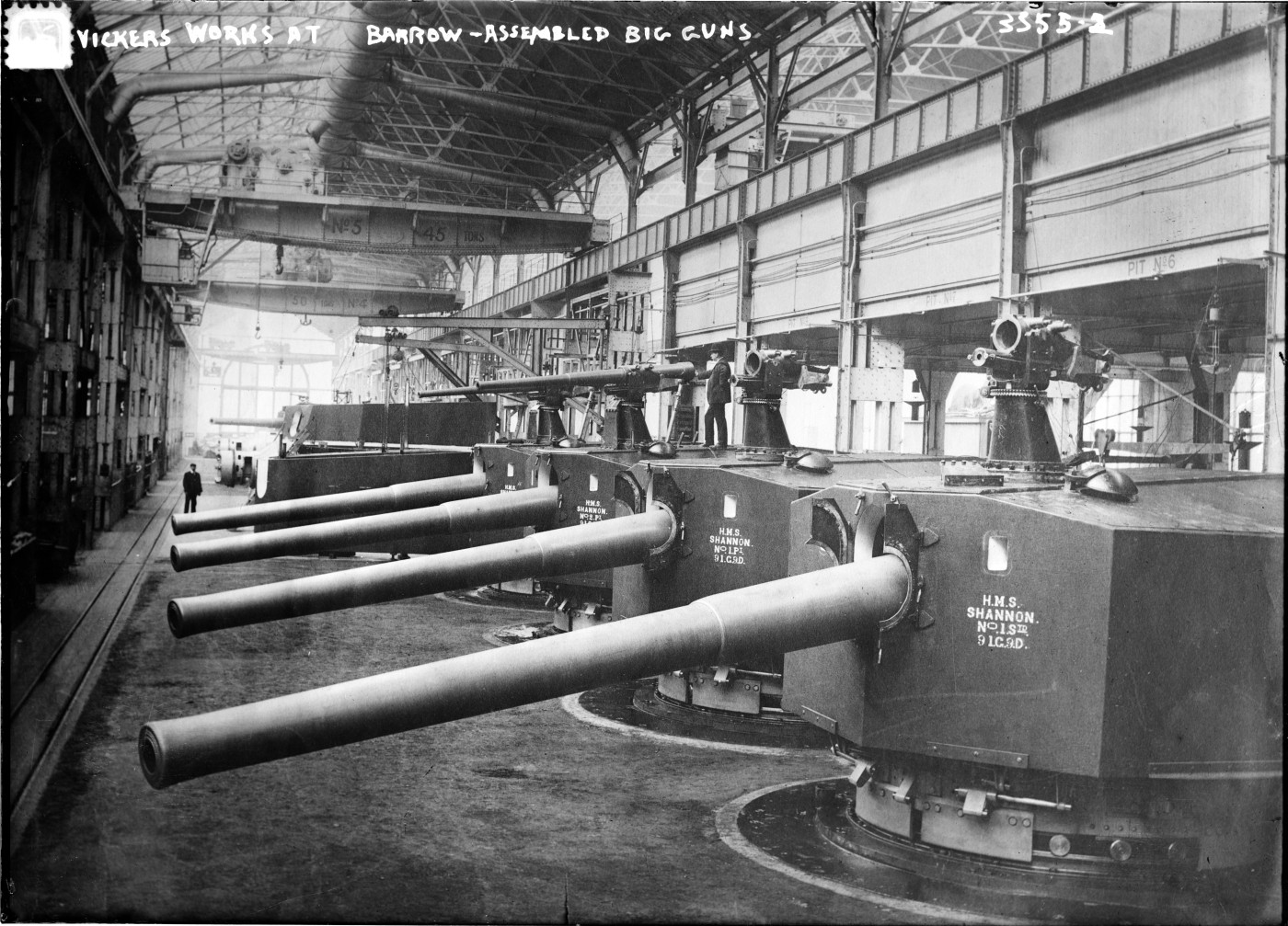
Shannon's 7.5-inch guns and turrets under construction. Note the 12-pounder guns and their mounts on the turret roofs.

The Minotaurs carried only four 50-calibre BL 9.2-inch Mk XI guns, compared to the six of the earlier ships, but the guns were mounted in twin hydraulically powered centreline turrets, which gave them the same four-gun broadside as the Duke of Edinburghs. The guns had an elevation range of −5°/+15°. They fired 380-pound (172 kg) projectiles at a muzzle velocity of 2,875 ft/s (876 m/s); this provided a maximum range of 16,200 yd (14,813 m) with armour-piercing (AP) shells. The rate of fire of these guns was up to four rounds per minute and the ships carried 100 rounds per gun.

The secondary armament was much heavier than the older ships, with five single hydraulically powered turrets equipped with 50-calibre BL 7.5-inch Mk II guns mounted on each side. The guns could be depressed to −7.5° and elevated to +15°. Using 4crh AP shells, they had a maximum range of 15,571 yd (14,238 m). Their 200-pound (91 kg) projectiles were fired at a muzzle velocity of 2,841 ft/s (866 m/s) at four rounds per minute. Each gun was provided with 100 rounds.

Anti-torpedo boat defence was provided by sixteen QF 12-pounder 18-cwt guns. Eight of these were mounted on the tops of the 7.5 inch gun turrets and the other eight in the superstructure (four fore and four aft), as per the deck plan illustration. They fired 3-inch (76 mm), 12.5-pound (5.7 kg) projectiles at a muzzle velocity of 2,660 ft/s (810 m/s); this gave a maximum range of 9,300 yd (8,500 m) at their maximum elevation of +20°. They also mounted five submerged 18-inch torpedo tubes, two on each broadside, plus one mounted in the stern.

=== Armour ===
Armour in the Minotaur class was reduced compared to the earlier ships. The upper belt, considered superfluous after the elimination of the main deck casemates, was eliminated as were the transverse bulkheads that connected the waterline belt to the barbettes that protected the ships from raking fire. The 6-inch (152 mm) waterline armour belt of Krupp cemented armour extended past the fore and aft 7.5-inch gun turrets; its lower edge was about 5 feet (1.5 m) below the waterline at normal load. Forward the armour was 4 inches (102 mm) up to about 50 feet (15.2 m) from the bow when it was reduced to three inches; aft the belt armour was three inches thick all the way to the stern. In addition to this, the engine cylinders were protected by armour plates 1.5–2 inches (38–51 mm) thick.

The faces of the primary gun turrets were 8 inches (203 mm) thick and they had 7-inch (178 mm) sides. The face armour for the 7.5-inch turrets was also eight inches thick, but their sides were only 6 inches (152 mm) thick. The main barbettes were protected by seven inches of armour as were the ammunition hoists, although the armour for those thinned to two inches between the lower and main decks. The thickness of the lower deck ranged from 1.5 inches on the flat amidships to two inches on the slope connecting it to the lower edge of the waterline belt for the length of the ship. At the ends of the ship, the thickness of the deck armour increased to two inches. The sides of the forward conning tower were 10 inches thick while those of the rear conning tower were three inches in thickness.

=== Modifications ===
The funnels were raised 15 feet (4.6 m) in 1909 to eliminate smoke interference with the bridge. During 1915–16, a 12-pounder was fitted to the rear superstructure and a three-pounder to the quarterdeck, both guns on high-angle mounts for anti-aircraft defence. In 1916, reinforcing legs were added to the foremast to support the weight of a fire-control director; Shannon received her director that same year and Minotaur in 1917–18. In the last year of the war, the reinforced foremast was replaced by a stronger tripod mast and the 12-pounder was moved to the top of the forward turret.

== Ships ==
Construction data
Ship	Builder	Date of			Fate	Cost
Ship	Builder	Laid down	Launched	Completion	Fate	Cost
Minotaur	HM Dockyard, Devonport	2 January 1905	6 June 1906	1 April 1908	Sold for scrap, 1920	£1,410,356
Shannon	HM Dockyard, Chatham	2 January 1905	20 September 1906	10 March 1908	Sold for scrap, 1920	£1,415,135
Defence	HM Dockyard, Pembroke	22 February 1905	24 April 1907	9 February 1909	Sunk at the Battle of Jutland, 31 May 1916	£1,362,970
Orion	-	-	-	-	Cancelled	-

== Careers ==
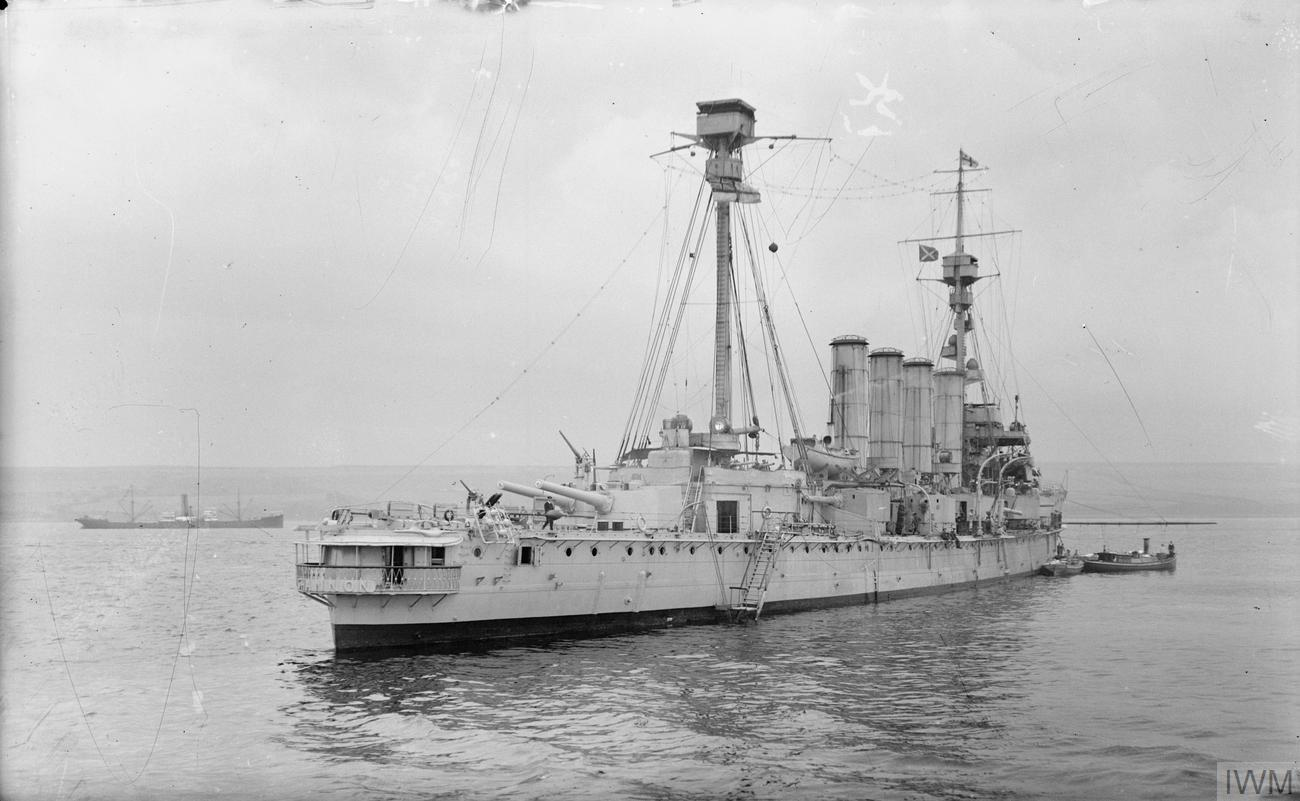
Stern view of Shannon, November 1915

The sisters were all initially assigned to the Home Fleet upon commissioning with Shannon frequently serving as the flagship of the 5th, 2nd and 3rd Cruiser Squadrons before reverting to the flagship of the 2nd Squadron in 1914. Minotaur became the flagship of the China Station in 1910 and she was briefly joined by Defence in 1912 before the latter was transferred to the Mediterranean at the end of the year to serve as flagship of the 1st Cruiser Squadron there.

When the war began, Minotaur searched unsuccessfully for the German East Asia Squadron in the Pacific and the commerce-raiding light cruiser Emden in the Indian Ocean before she was transferred to the Grand Fleet at the end of 1914. She became flagship of the 7th Cruiser Squadron and was assigned to the Northern Patrol. Defence participated in the pursuit of the German battlecruiser SMS Goeben and light cruiser SMS Breslau, but Rear-Admiral Ernest Troubridge decided not to engage Goeben due to the latter's more powerful guns, heavier armour and faster speed. She then blockaded the German ships inside the Dardanelles. The Admiralty ordered the ship to the South Atlantic in October to join Rear-Admiral Christopher Cradock's squadron searching for the German ships. Defence, however, had only reached Montevideo, Uruguay by 3 November when she received word that most of Admiral Cradock's squadron had been destroyed two days previously at the Battle of Coronel. The ship was then ordered to South Africa to escort a troop convoy to Great Britain. Defence departed Table Bay, Cape Town in December and rejoined the 1st Cruiser Squadron of the Grand Fleet as its flagship upon her arrival.

In early 1915, the sisters were all assigned to the Grand Fleet, each as flagship of their respective squadrons. Just before the Battle of Jutland on 31 May 1916, the 2nd and 7th Cruiser Squadrons were combined with Minotaur as the flagship. During the battle the 2nd Cruiser Squadron was unengaged and did not fire their guns. In contrast the 1st Cruiser Squadron was engaged at close range by the German capital ships during the battle; Defence was hit by two salvoes from the German ships that caused the aft 9.2-inch magazine to explode. The resulting fire spread via the ammunition passages to the adjacent 7.5-inch magazines which detonated in turn. The ship exploded with the loss of all men on board; between 893 and 903 men were killed.

Shannon and Minotaur were also present during the attempted interception of the High Seas Fleet by the Grand Fleet on 19 August although no combat occurred. For the rest of the war, the ships were assigned to the Northern Patrol. On 11 December 1917, the sisters and four destroyers were assigned to patrol the convoy route between Lerwick and Norway, but the Germans successfully destroyed a convoy off the Norwegian coast on the following day and returned home without being spotted. The British ships were only able to rescue survivors and escort the sole surviving ship from the convoy, the crippled destroyer Pellew, back to Scapa Flow.

The sisters were paid off in 1919, although Shannon temporarily became a training ship before the two were sold for scrap in 1920. Shannon was not actually broken up until January 1923.

== Bibliography ==
- Archibald, Edward H.H. (1984). The Fighting Ship in the Royal Navy (reprint of The Metal Fighting Ship in the Royal Navy ed.). Blandford Press. ISBN 0-7137-1348-8.
- Brown, David K. (2003) [1999]. The Grand Fleet: Warship Design and Development 1906–1922. Caxton Editions. ISBN 1-84067-531-4.
- Burt, R. A. (1987). "Minotaur: Before the Battlecruiser". Warship. 42. London: Conway Maritime Press: 83–95. ISSN 0142-6222.
- Campbell, John (1998). Jutland: An Analysis of the Fighting. Conway Maritime Press. ISBN 1-55821-759-2.
- Corbett, Julian. Naval Operations to the Battle of the Falklands. History of the Great War: Based on Official Documents. Vol. I (2nd ed.). Imperial War Museum and Battery Press. ISBN 0-89839-256-X.
- Corbett, Julian (1997) [1940]. Naval Operations. History of the Great War: Based on Official Documents. Vol. III (2nd ed.). Imperial War Museum in association with the Battery Press. ISBN 1-870423-50-X.
- Dodson, Aidan (2018). Before the Battlecruiser: The Big Cruiser in the World's Navies 1865-1910. Seaforth Publishing. ISBN 978-1-47389216-3.
- Friedman, Norman (2012). British Cruisers of the Victorian Era. Seaforth Publishing. ISBN 978-1-59114-068-9.
- Friedman, Norman (2011). Naval Weapons of World War One. Seaforth Publishing. ISBN 978-1-84832-100-7.
- Marder, Arthur J. (1978). From the Dreadnought to Scapa Flow, The Royal Navy in the Fisher Era, 1904–1919. Vol. III: Jutland and After, May 1916 – December 1916 (Second ed.). Oxford University Press. ISBN 0-19-215841-4.
- Newbolt, Henry (1996) [1928]. Naval Operations. History of the Great War Based on Official Documents. Vol. IV. Battery Press. ISBN 0-89839-253-5.
- Newbolt, Henry (1996) [1931]. Naval Operations. History of the Great War Based on Official Documents. Vol. V. Battery Press. ISBN 0-89839-255-1.
- Parkes, Oscar (1990) [1966]. British Battleships, Warrior 1860 to Vanguard 1950: A History of Design, Construction, and Armament (New & rev. ed.). Naval Institute Press. ISBN 1-55750-075-4.
- Roberts, John (1979). "Great Britain (including Empire Forces)". In Chesneau, Roger & Kolesnik, Eugene M. (eds.). Conway's All the World's Fighting Ships 1860–1905. Mayflower Books. pp. 1–113. ISBN 0-8317-0302-4.
