= HMS Defence (1907) =

Minotaur-class armoured cruiser

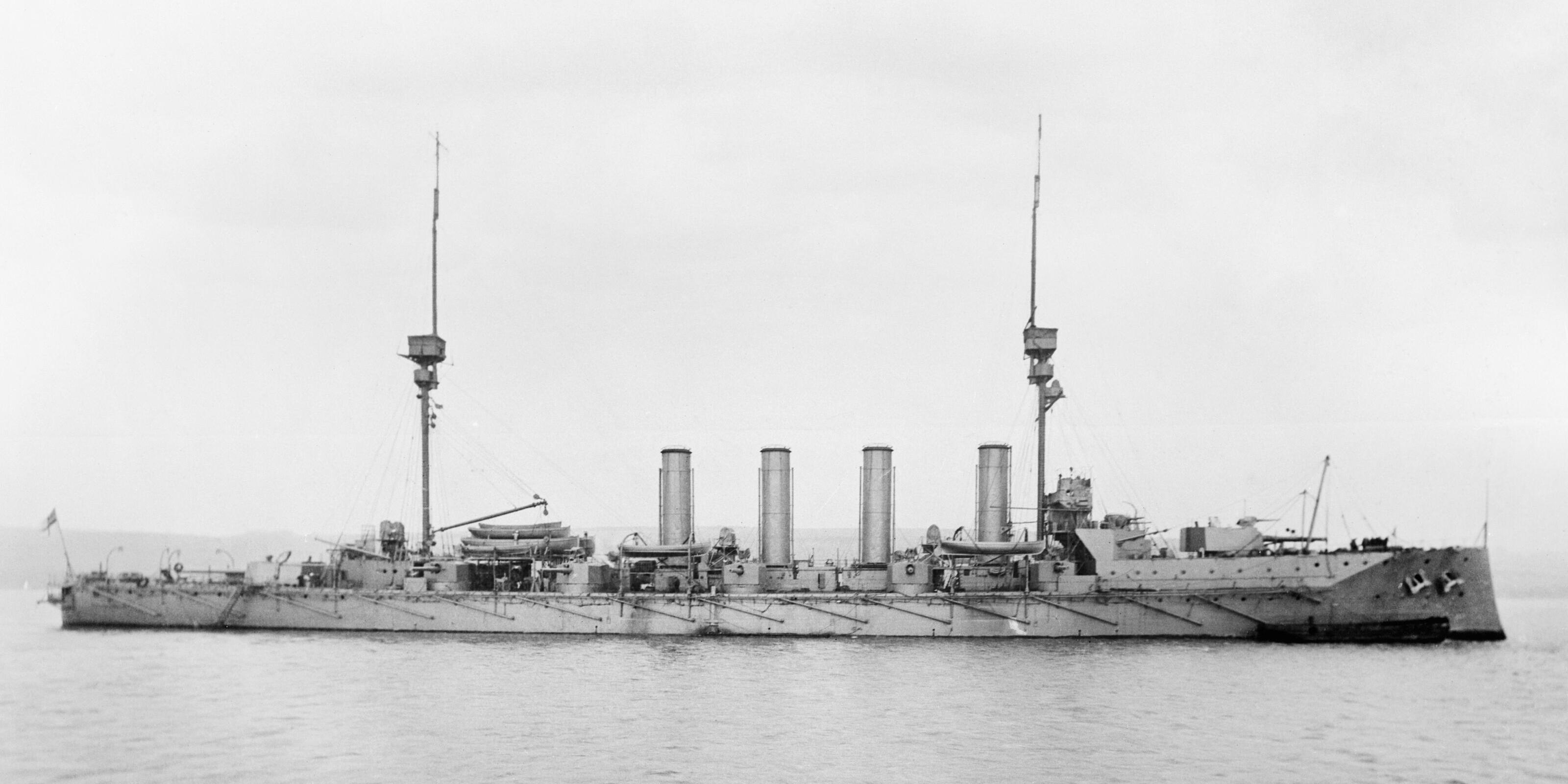
- HMS Defence

History

United Kingdom
- Name: Defence
- Ordered: 1904-05 Naval Programme
- Builder: Pembroke dockyard
- Laid down: 25 February 1905
- Launched: 24 April 1907
- Commissioned: 9 February 1909
- Fate: Sunk at the Battle of Jutland, 31 May 1916

General characteristics
- Class & type: Minotaur-class armoured cruiser
- Displacement: 14,600 long tons (14,800 t)
- Length: 490 ft (149.4 m) pp; 519 ft (158.2 m) overall
- Beam: 74.5 ft (22.7 m)
- Draught: 26 ft (7.9 m)
- Installed power: 24 Yarrow water-tube boilers; 27,000 ihp (20,000 kW)
- Propulsion: 2 shafts; 2 triple-expansion steam engines
- Speed: 23 knots (43 km/h; 26 mph)
- Range: 8,150 nmi (15,090 km; 9,380 mi) at 10 knots (19 km/h; 12 mph)
- Complement: 779
- Armament: 2 twin BL 9.2-inch Mk XI guns; 10 × single BL 7.5-inch Mk V guns; 16 single QF 12-pounder, 18 cwt guns; 5 × 18-inch torpedo tubes (Note: British "18-inch" torpedoes were 17.72 inches (45.0 cm) in diameter)
- Armour: Belt: 3–6 in (76–152 mm); Deck: 1.5–2 in (38–51 mm); Barbettes: 7 in (178 mm); Gun turrets: 4.5–8 in (114–203 mm); Conning tower: 10 in (254 mm)

HMS Defence was a Minotaur-class armoured cruiser built for the Royal Navy in the first decade of the 20th century, the last armoured cruiser built for the Royal Navy. She was stationed in the Mediterranean when the First World War began and participated in the pursuit of the German battlecruiser SMS Goeben and light cruiser SMS Breslau. The ship was transferred to the Grand Fleet in January 1915 and remained there for the rest of her career.

Defence was sunk on 31 May 1916 during the Battle of Jutland, the largest naval battle of the war. Escorting the main body of the Grand Fleet, the ship was fired upon by one German battlecruiser and four dreadnoughts as she attempted to engage a disabled German light cruiser. She was struck by two salvoes from the German ships that detonated her rear magazine. The fire from that explosion spread to the ship's secondary magazines, causing them to explode in turn. The entire crew is believed to have been killed, although newspapers of the time made unverified claims of possible survivors.

== Description ==
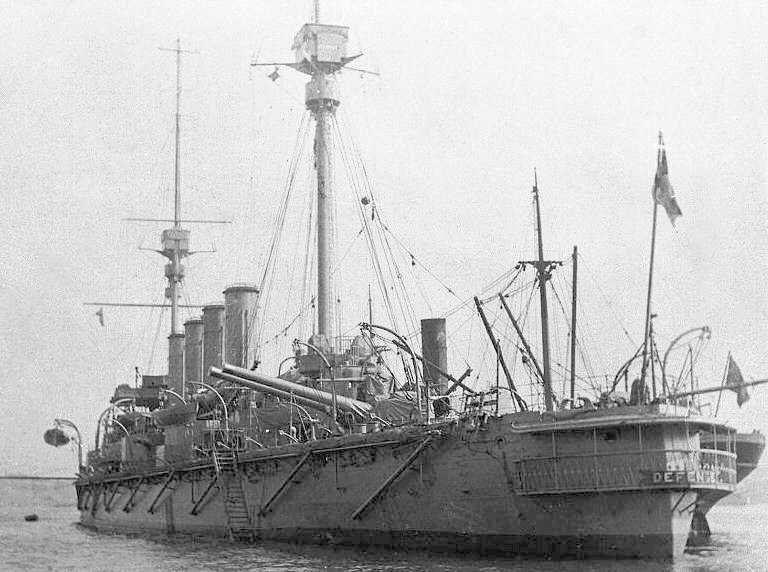
HMS Defence in 1907 - stern view

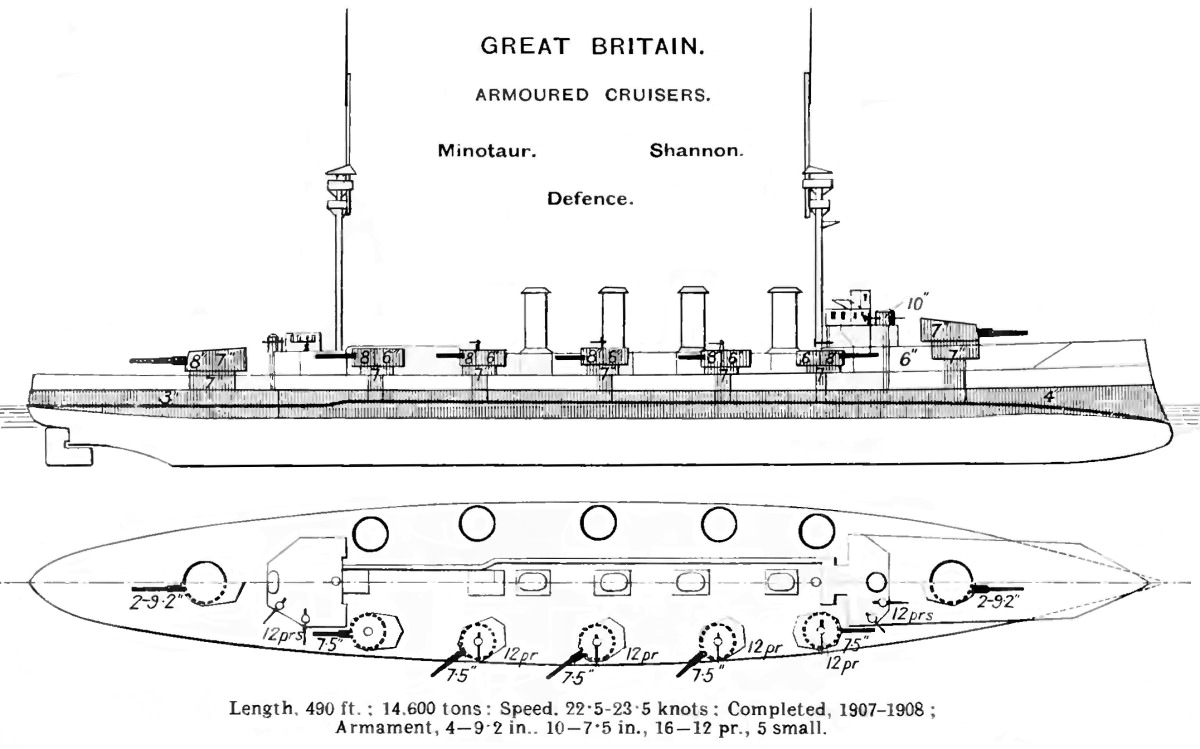
Right elevation and deck plan as depicted in Brassey's Naval Annual 1912. The shaded areas represent her armour.

Defence displaced 14,600 long tons (14,800 t) as built and 16,630 long tons (16,900 t) at deep load. The ship had an overall length of 519 feet (158.2 m), a beam of 74 feet 6 inches (22.7 m) and a mean draught of 26 feet (7.9 m). She was powered by a pair of four-cylinder triple-expansion steam engines, each driving one shaft, which developed a total of 27,000 indicated horsepower (20,000 kW) and gave a maximum speed of 23 knots (43 km/h; 26 mph). The engines were powered by 24 Yarrow water-tube boilers. The ship carried a maximum of 2,060 long tons (2,090 t) of coal and an additional 750 long tons (760 t) of fuel oil that was sprayed on the coal to increase its burn rate. At full capacity, she could steam for 8,150 nautical miles (15,090 km; 9,380 mi) at a speed of 10 knots (19 km/h; 12 mph). Defence was designed to carry 779 officers and men.

The ship's main armament consisted of four BL 9.2-inch Mark X guns in two twin-gun turrets, one each fore and aft. Her secondary armament of ten BL 7.5-inch Mark II guns were mounted amidships in single turrets. Anti-torpedo boat defence was provided by sixteen QF 12-pounder (three-inch) 18-cwt guns. (Note: "Cwt" is the abbreviation for hundredweight, 18 cwt referring to the weight of the gun.) Defence also mounted five submerged 17.7-inch torpedo tubes, one of which was mounted in the stern.

The waterline belt consisted of 6 inches (152 mm) of Krupp cemented armour roughly between the fore and aft 7.5-inch gun turrets, but was reduced in steps to three inches to the ends of the ship. The gun turrets and barbettes were protected by 6–8 in (152–203 mm) of armour. The thickness of the lower deck was 1.5–2 inches (38–51 mm). The armour of the conning tower was 10 inches (254 mm) thick.

== Construction and career ==
Defence was ordered as part of the 1904–05 naval construction programme as the last of three Minotaur-class armoured cruisers. She was laid down on 22 February 1905 at the Royal Dockyard in Pembroke Dock, Wales. She was christened on 27 April 1907 by Lady Cawdor and commissioned on 3 February 1909 at the cost of £1,362,970. The ship was briefly assigned to the 5th Cruiser Squadron of the Home Fleet until she was transferred to the 2nd Cruiser Squadron when the Home Fleet reorganised on 23 March 1909. Three months later Defence was reassigned to the 1st Cruiser Squadron. She escorted the ocean liner RMS Medina in 1911–1912 while the latter ship served as the royal yacht for the newly crowned King George V's trip to India to attend the Delhi Durbar. After the ship returned to Plymouth in early 1912, Defence was transferred to the China Station, where she remained until December when she was ordered to rejoin the 1st Cruiser Squadron in the Mediterranean as flagship.

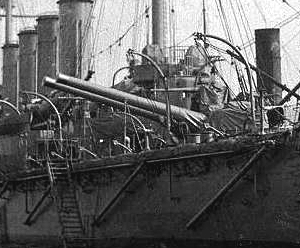
Detail view, showing the BL 9.2-inch Mk XI guns

At the start of the First World War, she was involved in the pursuit of the German warships Goeben and Breslau, but Rear-Admiral Ernest Troubridge decided not to engage Goeben due to the latter's more powerful guns, heavier armour and faster speed. She then blockaded the German ships inside the Dardanelles until the ship was ordered on 10 September to the South Atlantic to take part in the hunt for Admiral Graf von Spee's East Asia Squadron. The order was cancelled on 14 September when it became clear that the German squadron was still in the Eastern Pacific and Defence returned to the Dardanelles. The Admiralty again ordered the ship to the South Atlantic in October to join Rear-Admiral Christopher Cradock's squadron searching for the German ships. Defence, however, had only reached Montevideo, Uruguay by 3 November 1914 when she received word that most of Admiral Cradock's squadron had been destroyed two days previously at the Battle of Coronel. The ship rendezvoused with the battlecruisers HMS Inflexible and HMS Invincible later that month and transferred her long-range radio equipment to Invincible before sailing to South Africa to escort a troop convoy to Great Britain. Defence departed Table Bay, Cape Town on 8 December and rejoined the 1st Cruiser Squadron of the Grand Fleet as its flagship upon her arrival.

Defence received a QF 12-pounder (3-inch) 12 cwt anti-aircraft (AA) gun and a QF 3-pounder (47 mm) AA gun in 1915–16. The 12-pounder gun was mounted on the aft superstructure and the 3-pounder on the quarterdeck at the extreme rear.

During the Battle of Jutland on 31 May 1916, she was the flagship of Rear-Admiral Sir Robert Arbuthnot, leading the First Cruiser Squadron and was captained by Stanley Venn Ellis. The squadron formed the starboard flank of the cruiser screen, ahead of the main body of the Grand Fleet. Defence was just to the right of the centre of the line. At 17:47, (Note: The times used in this article are in UTC, which is one hour behind CET, which is often used in German works.) Defence and HMS Warrior, the leading two ships of the squadron, spotted the German II Scouting Group and opened fire. Their shells fell short and the two ships turned to port in pursuit, cutting in front of the battlecruiser HMS Lion, which was forced to turn away to avoid a collision. Shortly afterwards, they spotted the disabled German light cruiser SMS Wiesbaden and closed to engage. When the two ships reached a range of 5,500 yards (5,000 m) from Wiesbaden they were spotted in turn at 18:05 by the German battlecruiser SMS Derfflinger and four battleships which were less than 8,000 yards (7,300 m) away. The fire from the German ships was heavy and Defence was hit by two salvoes from the German ships that caused the aft 9.2-inch magazine to explode. The resulting fire spread via the ammunition passages to the adjacent 7.5-inch magazines which detonated in turn. The ship exploded at 18:20 with the loss of all hands; between 893 and 903 men were killed.

=== Captains ===
- Captain Thomas Webster Kemp: August 1908 — November 1908
- Captain Cecil Dampier: November 1908 — January 1911
- Captain Henry Bruce: January 1911 — January 1913
- Captain Fawcet Wray: January 1913 — October 1914
- Captain Eustace La Trobe Leatham: October 1914 — January 1916
- Captain Stanley Venn Ellis: January — May 1916 †

== Defence today ==
At the time, it was believed that Defence had been reduced to fragments by the explosion, but the wreck was discovered in mid-1984 by Clive Cussler and a NUMA survey of the North Sea and English Channel at coordinates 56°58′02″N 05°49′50″E. It was dived upon in 2001 by a team led by nautical archaeologist Innes McCartney and found to be largely intact, despite the violence of her sinking. Defence, along with the other Jutland wrecks, was belatedly declared a protected place under the Protection of Military Remains Act 1986, to discourage further damage to the resting place of approximately 900 men.
