= Zeppelin LZ 55 =

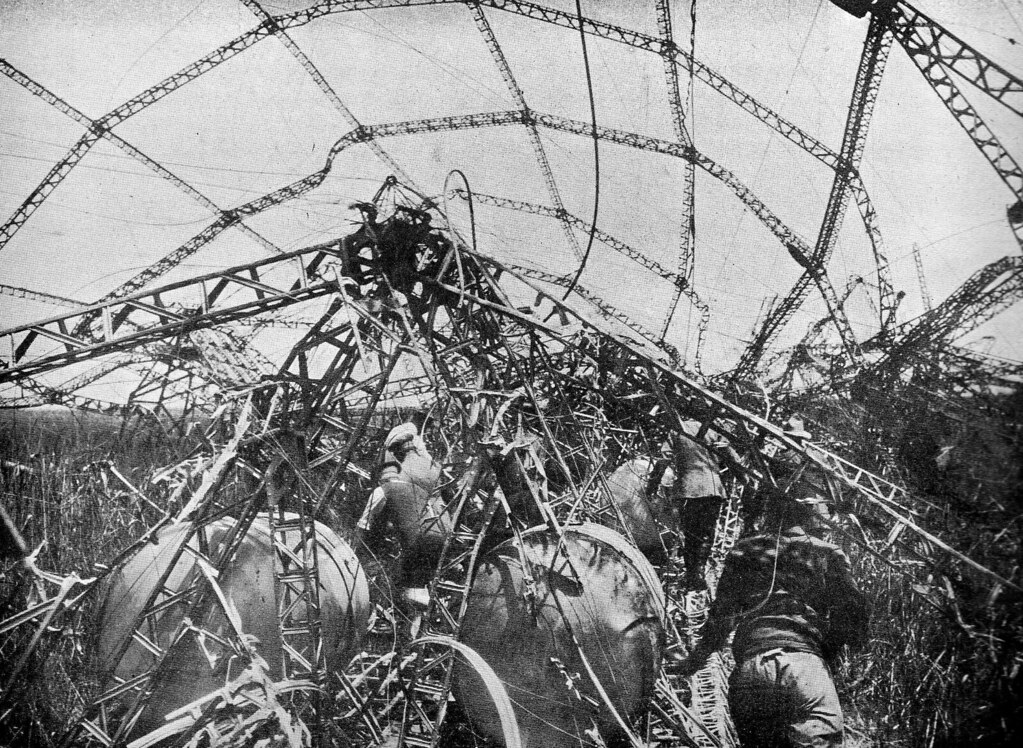
Wreckage of LZ 55 on the marshes near mouth of the Varder River during the Salonika Campaign

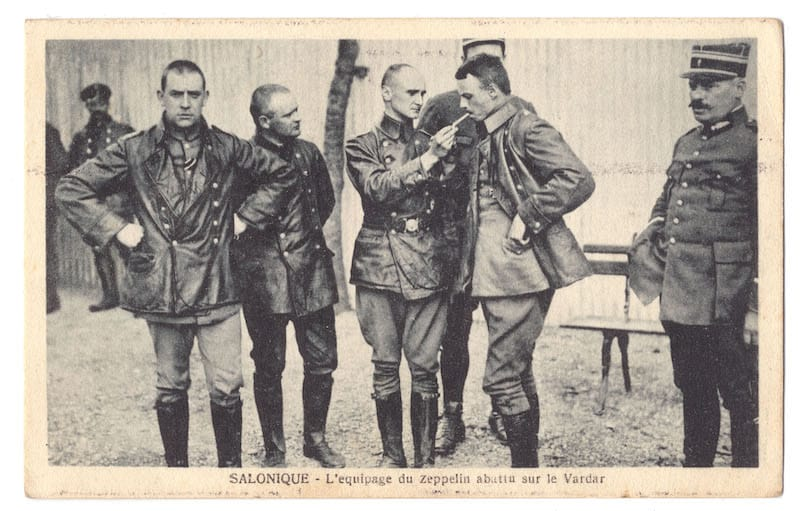
The captured crew of LZ 55.

Zeppelin LZ 55 (Army tactical number LZ 85) was a P-class Zeppelin of the Imperial German Army in World War I. It was shot down by the old British pre-dreadnought battleship HMS Agamemnon in 1916 during the Salonika campaign

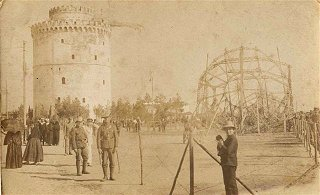
Reconstructed wreckage of LZ 55, next to the White Tower

== History ==
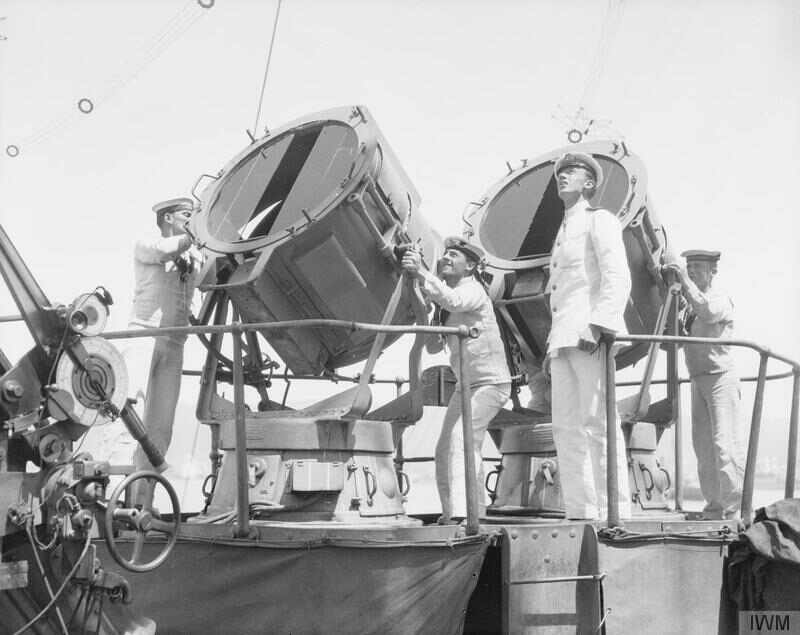
Searchlight crew on HMS Agamemnonre-enacting spotting the Zeppelin

On 5 May 1916 LZ55 made another attack on Thessaloniki (Salonika) harbour. Part way through the attack it was caught in spotlights. and all the ships in the area opened fire with their anti-aircraft guns. LZ55 continued its attack but HMS Agamemnon's 12-pounder anti-aircraft gun hit LZ 55; breaking it in half according to one of the crew. The airship crashed in the swamps at the mouth of the Vardar River west of Thessaloniki and its crew were captured. The crash site soon became a tourist attraction, with a report that "a dozen Canadian nurses. They had come up ... and waded through to it. What a sight they did look, skirts up round their waists wading through mud and slime up to their knees."

The metal structure of the Zeppelin was dragged by Allied soldiers from the swamps to the White Tower of Thessaloniki. There it was reconstructed so that Allied engineers could study how the Germans built airships.

== Specifications (LZ55 / P-class zeppelin) ==
Data from Zeppelin : rigid airships, 1893-1940

General characteristics

- Crew: 18
- Capacity: 16,200 kg (35,715 lb) typical disposable load
- Length: 163.5 m (536 ft 5 in)
- Diameter: 18.7 m (61 ft 4 in) maximum
- Fineness ratio: 8.68
- Volume: 31,900 m^{3} (1,130,000 cu ft) in 15 gas cells
- Empty weight: 20,800 kg (45,856 lb)
- Fuel capacity: 4,800 kg (10,582 lb) maximum
- Useful lift: 37,000 kg (82,000 lb) typically
- Gas loading: 1.16 kg/m^{3} (0.072 lb/cu ft)
- Powerplant: 4 × Maybach HS Lu 6-cylinder water-cooled in-line piston engines, 180 kW (240 hp) each

(initially with 4x 157 kW (210 hp) Maybach C-X engines)

- Propellers: 2-bladed fixed-pitch propellers

Performance

- Maximum speed: 96 km/h (60 mph, 52 kn)
- Cruise speed: 90 km/h (56 mph, 49 kn)
- Range: 4,300 km (2,700 mi, 2,300 nmi) at 90 km/h (56 mph; 49 kn)
- Service ceiling: 2,800 m (9,200 ft) static

Armament
machine guns in hull-top positions and gondolas with provision for bombs

== See also ==
- List of Zeppelins

== Bibliography ==
- Burt, R. A. (1988). British Battleships, 1889-1904. Naval Institute Press. ISBN 9780870210617.
- Buxton, Ian (2008). Big Gun Monitors. Pen and Sword. ISBN 9781783469116.
- Moody, Simon; Wakefield, Alan (2011). Under the Devil's Eye: The British Military Experience in Macedonia, 1915–18. Casemate Publisher. ISBN 9781844682669.
- Tennyson, Brian Douglas (2013). The Canadian Experience of the Great War: A Guide to Memoirs. Scarecrow Press. ISBN 9780810886803.
