= HMS Agamemnon (1906) =

Lord Nelson-class pre-dreadnought battleship

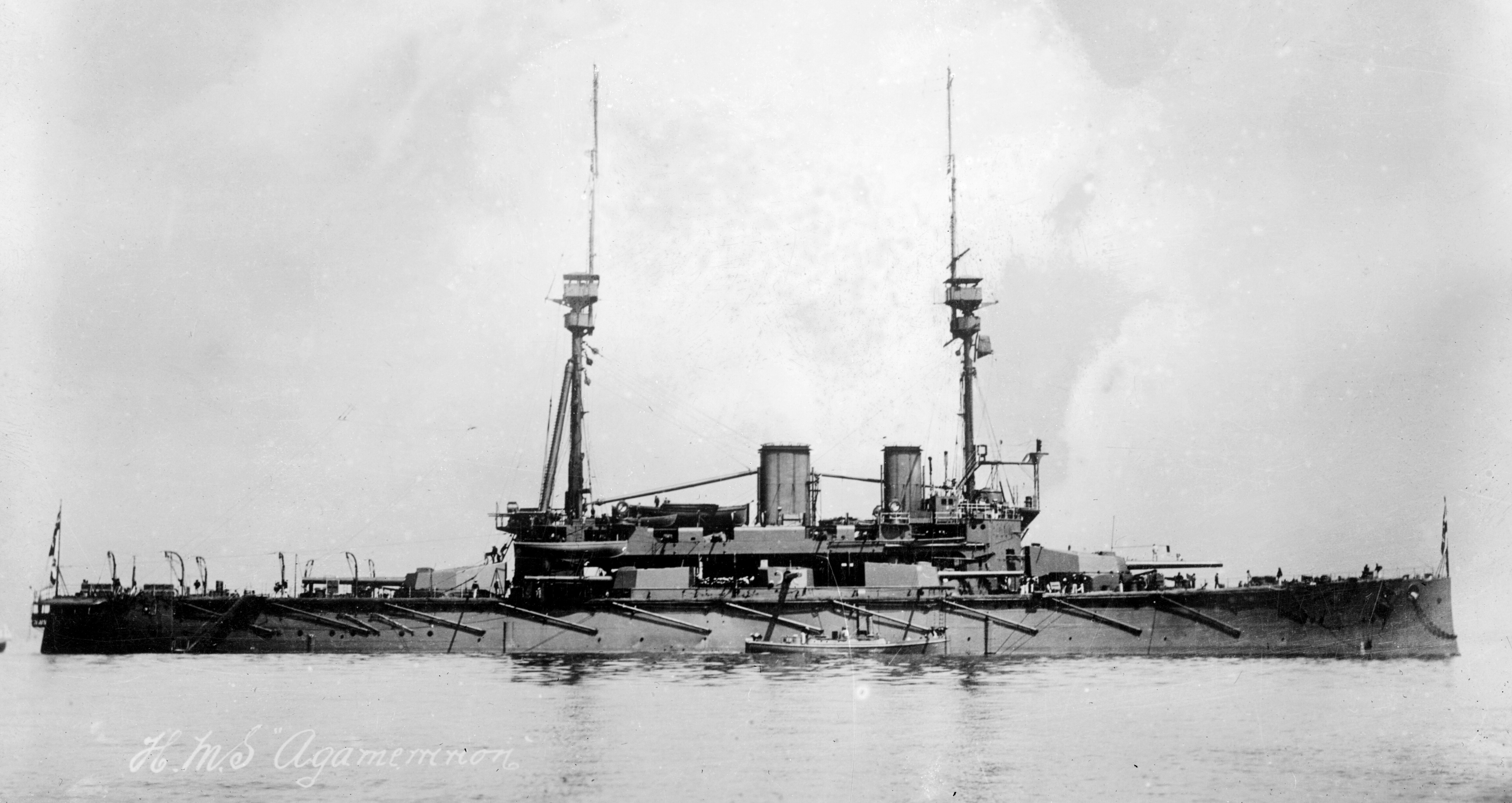
- Agamemnon

History

United Kingdom
- Name: Agamemnon
- Builder: William Beardmore and Company Dalmuir
- Cost: £1,652,347
- Laid down: 15 May 1905
- Launched: 23 June 1906
- Sponsored by: Countess of Aberdeen
- Completed: June 1908
- Commissioned: 25 June 1908
- Decommissioned: 20 March 1919
- Reclassified: Target ship 1921–1926
- Fate: Sold for scrap, 24 January 1927
- Notes: The last surviving British predreadnought when scrapped

General characteristics
- Class & type: Lord Nelson-class pre-dreadnought battleship
- Displacement: 16,500 long tons (16,800 t); 17,683 long tons (17,967 t) deep load
- Length: 443 ft 6 in (135.2 m)
- Beam: 79 ft 6 in (24.2 m)
- Draught: 26 ft 9 in (8.2 m)
- Installed power: 15 water-tube boilers; 16,750 ihp (12,490 kW)
- Propulsion: 2 shafts, 2 triple-expansion steam engines
- Speed: 18 knots (33 km/h; 21 mph)
- Range: 9,180 nautical miles (17,000 km; 10,560 mi) at 10 knots (19 km/h; 12 mph)
- Complement: 800–817
- Armament: 2 × twin 12 in (305 mm) guns; 4 × twin, 2 × single 9.2 in (234 mm) guns; 24 × single 12-pdr (3 in (76 mm)) guns; 5 × 18 in (457 mm) torpedo tubes
- Armour: Belt: 12 in (305 mm); Decks: 1–4 in (25–102 mm); Barbettes: 3–12 in (76–305 mm); Main gun turrets: 12–13.5 in (305–343 mm); Secondary gun turrets: 3–7 in (76–178 mm); Conning tower: 12 in (305 mm); Bulkheads: 8 in (203 mm)

HMS Agamemnon was one of two Lord Nelson-class pre-dreadnought battleships launched in 1906 and completed in 1908. She was the Royal Navy's second-to-last pre-dreadnought battleship to be built, followed by her sister ship, Lord Nelson. She was assigned to the Channel Fleet when the First World War began in 1914. The ship was transferred to the Mediterranean Sea with Lord Nelson in early 1915 to participate in the Dardanelles campaign. She made a number of bombardments against Turkish fortifications and in support of British troops. Agamemnon remained in the Mediterranean after the conclusion of that campaign to prevent the German battlecruiser SMS Goeben and light cruiser Breslau from breaking out into the Mediterranean. Agamemnon shot down the German Zeppelin LZ-55 (LZ-85) during a bombing mission over Salonica in 1916. On 30 October 1918, the Ottoman Empire signed the Armistice of Mudros on board the ship while she was anchored at Lemnos in the northern Aegean Sea. She was converted to a radio-controlled target ship following her return to the United Kingdom in March 1919 and began service in 1921. Agamemnon was the last pre-dreadnought in service with the Royal Navy; she was replaced by Centurion at the end of 1926 and sold for scrap in January 1927.

== Construction and description ==
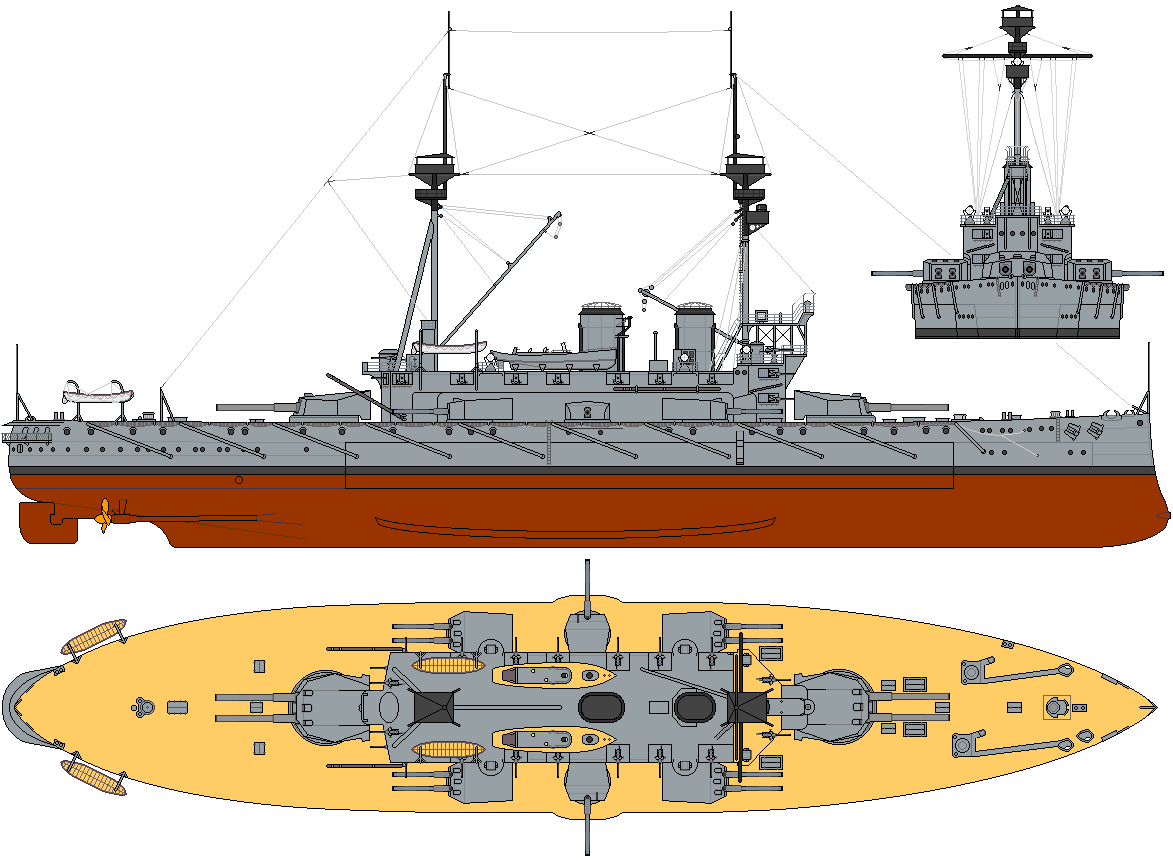
Profile drawing of HMS Agamemnon as she was in 1908

HMS Agamemnon was ordered in 1904 and was the first warship built by the William Beardmore and Company's Dalmuir Naval Construction Works. She was laid down on 15 May 1905 and launched on 23 June 1906 before the dockyards themselves were finished. Her completion was greatly delayed by labour troubles and by the diversion of the 12-inch (305 mm) guns intended for her to expedite completion of Dreadnought, and she was not finally completed until June 1908, six months before her sister Lord Nelson.

Agamemnon displaced 17,683 long tons (17,967 t) at deep load as built, with a length of 443 feet 6 inches (135.2 m), a beam of 79 feet 6 inches (24.2 m) and a draft of 26 feet 9 inches (8.2 m). She was powered by two inverted vertical triple expansion four-cylinder steam engines, which developed a total of 16,750 indicated horsepower (12,490 kW) and gave a maximum speed of 18 knots (33 km/h; 21 mph).

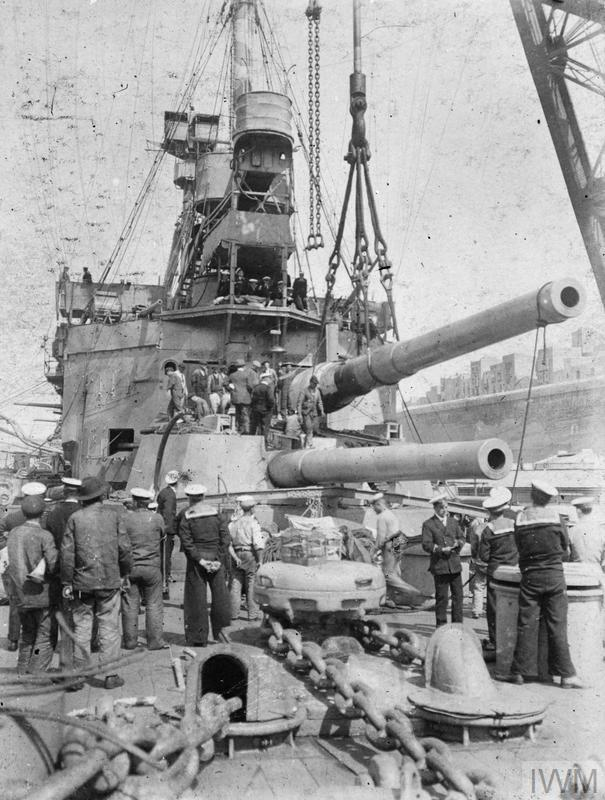
Agamemnon has her main guns replaced at Malta in May–June 1915

The ship was armed with four BL 12-inch Mk X guns arranged in two twin gun turrets, one each fore and aft. Her secondary armament consisted of ten BL 9.2-inch Mk XI guns, in twin gun turrets on each corner of the superstructure, and a single gun turret between them, plus 24 QF 12-pounder 18 cwt guns. She also mounted five submerged 18-inch (457 mm) torpedo tubes, for which 23 torpedoes were stowed aboard.

Agamemnon had an armour belt at her waterline that was 12 inches (305 mm) thick, as were the faces and sides of her gun turrets.

== Service history ==
=== Pre-First World War ===
HMS Agamemnon commissioned on 25 June 1908 at Chatham Dockyard for service in the Nore Division of the Home Fleet. On 11 February 1911, she grazed an uncharted rock in the harbour at Ferrol, Spain, and damaged her bottom. She was temporarily attached in September 1913 to the 4th Battle Squadron.

=== First World War ===
After the First World War began in August 1914, Agamemnon was assigned to the 5th Battle Squadron in the Channel Fleet and was based at Portland. With other ships, she covered the safe transport of the British Expeditionary Force, under the command of Sir John French, to France. On 14 November, she transferred to Sheerness to guard the English coast against the possibility of a German invasion. She returned to Portland on 30 December and was employed in the defence of the southern ports of England and patrols of the English Channel until February 1915.

==== Dardanelles campaign, 1915–16 ====
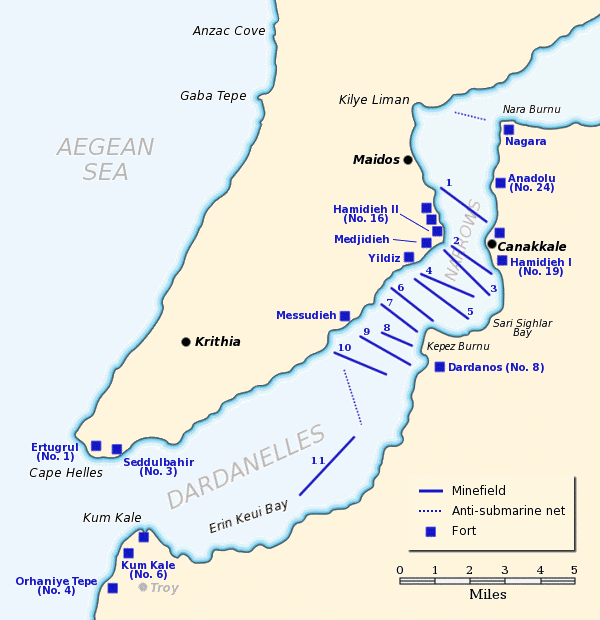
Map of the Dardanelles and its defences

In February 1915, Agamemnon was ordered to participate in the Dardanelles campaign. She departed Portland on 9 February, and joined the British Dardanelles Squadron at Mudros 10 days later. That was the second day of the opening bombardment of the Ottoman Turkish forts guarding the entrance to the Dardanelles, and the ship immediately joined the attack. She also took part in the subsequent bombardment of the inner forts later in February. Agamemnon was hit by seven 9.4-inch (240 mm) shells in ten minutes on 25 February and was holed above the waterline, suffering three dead.

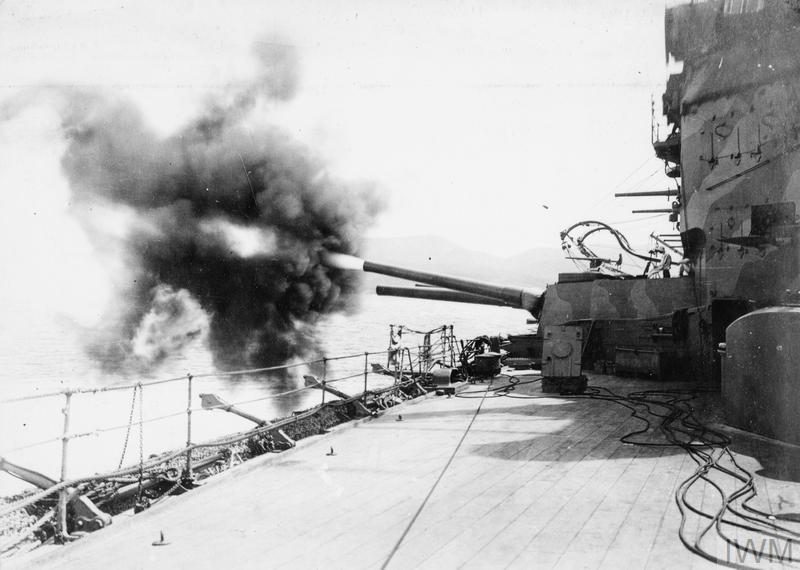
Agamemnon fires her 9.2-inch guns at Ottoman Turkish forts at Sedd el Bahr on 4 March 1915

She supported the small amphibious landings of 4 March and participated in another bombardment on 6 March 1915. She came under heavy fire from Fort Hamidieh on 7 March, taking eight hits from large-calibre shells; one of them, allegedly a 14-inch (356 mm) round, blew a large hole in her quarterdeck and wrecked the wardroom and the gunroom. She also took several hits by light shells that day, and, although she suffered damage to her superstructure, her fighting and steaming capabilities were not seriously impaired.

The ship also participated in the main attack on the Dardanelles forts on 18 March. This time, a 6-inch (152 mm) howitzer battery opened fire on Agamemnon and hit her 12 times in 25 minutes; five of the howitzer shells hit her armour and did no damage, but the seven that hit outside her armour protection did considerable structural damage and temporarily put one of her 12-inch (305 mm) guns out of action.

On 25 April, Agamemnon supported the main landings as part of the 5th Squadron, and after that she patrolled to protect Allied minesweeping and netlaying vessels operating in the Dardanelles. In action against Ottoman field batteries, she took two hits between 28 April and 30 April, and she provided fire support for Allied troops during a Turkish counterattack on 1 May. Agamemnon bombarded Ottoman artillery batteries on 6 May prior to the Second Battle of Krithia.

Agamemnon was withdrawn to Malta later in May to undergo a refit and returned to the Dardanelles in June. On 2 December, the ship joined the protected cruiser Endymion and monitor M33 in bombarding the Kavak bridge, destroying several spans of it and interdicting Ottoman communications to the Gallipoli Peninsula.

==== Mediterranean operations, 1916–18 ====
With the end of the Dardanelles Campaign in January 1916, British naval forces in the area were reorganized, and Agamemnon became part of the Eastern Mediterranean Squadron, which was renamed the Aegean Squadron in August 1917. Under both names, the squadron was dispersed throughout the area to protect Allied-held islands, support the British Army at Salonika, and guard against any attempted breakout from the Dardanelles by the German battlecruiser Goeben and light cruiser Breslau. Agamemnon spent the remainder of the war based at Salonika and Mudros, alternating between the two bases with her sister Lord Nelson; Agamemnon was based mostly at Mudros, Lord Nelson mostly at Salonika. While carrying out these duties, Agamemnon damaged the Imperial German Navy Zeppelin LZ-55 (LZ-85) on 5 May 1916 at Salonika with a shell from a 12-pounder and forced it to crash-land.

Of all the responsibilities given the two ships, the most important was to guard the Eastern Mediterranean against a breakout by Goeben, but when Goeben and Breslau finally made their breakout attempt on 20 January 1918, Lord Nelson was away at Salonika and Agamemnon could not get steam up to depart Mudros in time to participate in the resulting Battle of Imbros. After both German ships struck mines, Breslau sank and Goeben returned to the Dardanelles before Agamemnon could arrive on the scene.

Agamemnon underwent a refit at Malta in 1918. On 30 October, the Ottoman Empire signed the Armistice of Mudros on board Agamemnon while she was anchored at Lemnos in the northern Aegean Sea.

=== Post-war ===
Agamemnon was part of the British squadron that went to Constantinople in November 1918 following the armistice. She returned to the United Kingdom in March 1919, where she paid off at Chatham Dockyard and went into reserve on 20 March.

In September 1918, the Commander-in-Chief, Grand Fleet, Admiral David Beatty, had called for a large target to be provided which would allow realistic gunnery practice for the battleships of the Grand Fleet, which had seen little action since the Battle of Jutland in 1916. Tests against armour plate in 1919 demonstrated that firing 15-inch (381-mm) guns at any pre-dreadnought would sink her quickly, but the use of a pre-dreadnought for target practice and tests by guns of 6-inch calibre (152-mm) or smaller seemed practical. At first, the pre-dreadnought Hibernia was suggested for target duties, but ultimately Agamemnon became available and was selected instead.

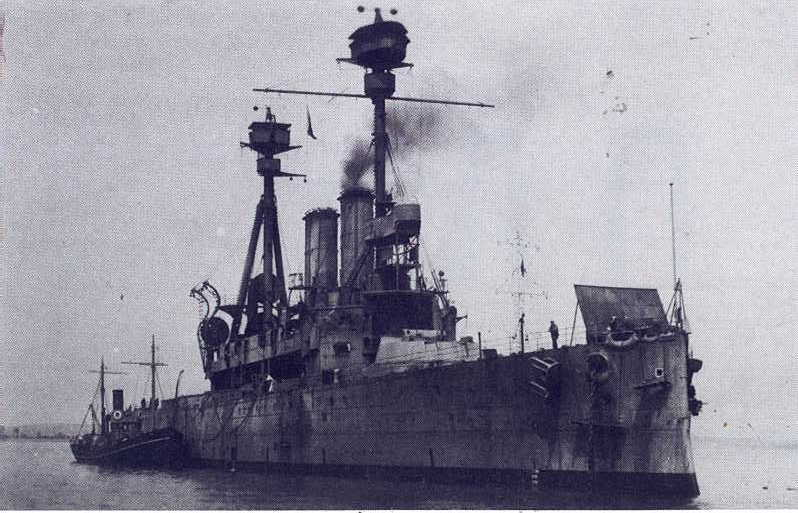
Agamemnon in 1924–25 during her service as a target ship

Based on the earlier experience in radio-controlled British drone weapons, Agamemnon was modified at Chatham Dockyard for use as a target ship between 6 December 1920 and 8 April 1921. (Note: Most sources say that Agamemnon served as a target ship from 1923 to 1926, and Burt, p. 298, says that she underwent conversion to a radio-controlled target ship from September 1922 to April 1923. However, Burt, p. 295, provides specifics about her conversion to a radio-controlled target ship in 1920–21, as well as specifics about her use as a target in 1921. It is possible that the conversion took place in 1920–1921 and is often confused with a 1922–23 refit.) The ship was rewired for radio control and stripped; the 12-inch turrets remained aboard, but all of her guns and their equipment were removed, as were her torpedo equipment, flying deck, sea cabins, main derrick and boat equipment, lower conning tower, masts and yards, most of her crew amenities, and other unnecessary equipment. Unnecessary hatches, coamings, scuttles, and lifts were removed and plated over, and she was ballasted differently than she had been as a battleship. It was not intended to sink her, so she was assigned a crew of 153 to maintain and operate her when she was not under fire.

Agamemnon's first target service took place before her modifications were completed. On 19 March 1921, she was exposed to a cloud of poisonous gas to determine the effect of gas on a battleship. It was found that gas could penetrate the ship via her various openings, but the ship had not been sealed against gas before the trial and no accurate results applicable to a commissioned battleship could be obtained. On 21 September, she was subjected to machine-gun fire by strafing aircraft. These trials showed that such strafing could harass a battleship, but could not impair her fighting or steaming capabilities, and helped to determine protection for bridge personnel.

Agamemnon also was used to test the vulnerability of battleships to 6-inch (152-mm), 5.5-inch (140-mm), and 4.7-inch (120-mm) rounds fired at her by ships such as the battlecruisers Renown and Repulse while she maneuvered under radio control. These tests showed that ships protected as well as Agamemnon, such as the later dreadnoughts, would suffer damage to their upper works if struck by such shells, but would not have their steaming or fighting capability seriously impaired even by numerous smaller-caliber hits.

== Disposal ==
Agamemnon was relieved as target ship by the dreadnought Centurion in December 1926. By then the last British pre-dreadnought battleship in existence, she was sold to J Cashmore of Newport, South Wales, on 24 January 1927 for scrap, and departed Portsmouth Dockyard on 1 March to be broken up at Newport.
