= BL 9.2-inch Mk XI naval gun =

BL 9.2-inch Mk XI gun
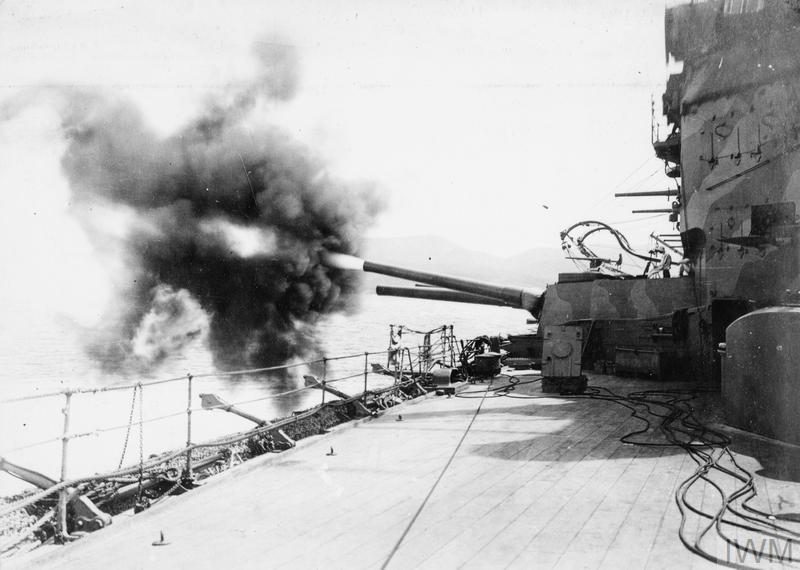
- Agamemnon fires her 9.2-inch secondary guns at Ottoman Turkish forts at Sedd el Bahr on 4 March 1915
- Type: Naval gun
- Place of origin: United Kingdom

Service history
- In service: 1908 – 1920
- Used by: United Kingdom
- Wars: World War I

Production history
- Designer: Vickers
- Designed: 1902

Specifications
- Mass: 28 tons barrel & breech
- Barrel length: 38 ft 4 in (11.68 m) bore (50 cal)
- Shell: 380 pounds (172.4 kg) Lyddite, Armour-piercing, Shrapnel
- Calibre: 9.2 inches (233.7 mm)
- Muzzle velocity: 2,875 ft/s (876 m/s)

The BL 9.2-inch Mark XI gun (Note: Mark XI = Mark 11. Britain use Roman numerals to denote Marks (models) of ordnance until after World War II. Hence this was the eleventh model of BL 9.2-inch gun.) was a British 50 calibre high-velocity naval gun which was mounted as primary armament on armoured cruisers and secondary armament on pre-dreadnought battleships.

== History ==
The gun with its increased length of 50 calibres was an attempt to extract a higher velocity, and hence more range and armour-piercing capability, from the 9.2-inch gun. Like other British 50-calibre guns of the period, it was relatively unsuccessful and was the last model of 9.2-inch gun Britain built.

Guns were mounted in the following ships :

- Minotaur-class armoured cruisers laid down 1905 & completed 1908–1909: 2 twin mounts.
- Lord Nelson-class battleships laid down 1905 & completed 1908: 4 twin mounts and 2 single mounts.

After the scrapping of these ships, these guns and mountings were retained in storage. There was the intention, at one point, early during World War Two, to use them as armament for small monitors which would have been reduced versions of the Roberts-class monitors; this however never advanced beyond the planning stage.

== See also ==
- List of naval guns

== Bibliography ==
The National Archives of the United Kingdom, Kew. SUPP 6/61
