= QF 12-pounder 18 cwt naval gun =

Ordnance QF 12-pounder 18 cwt
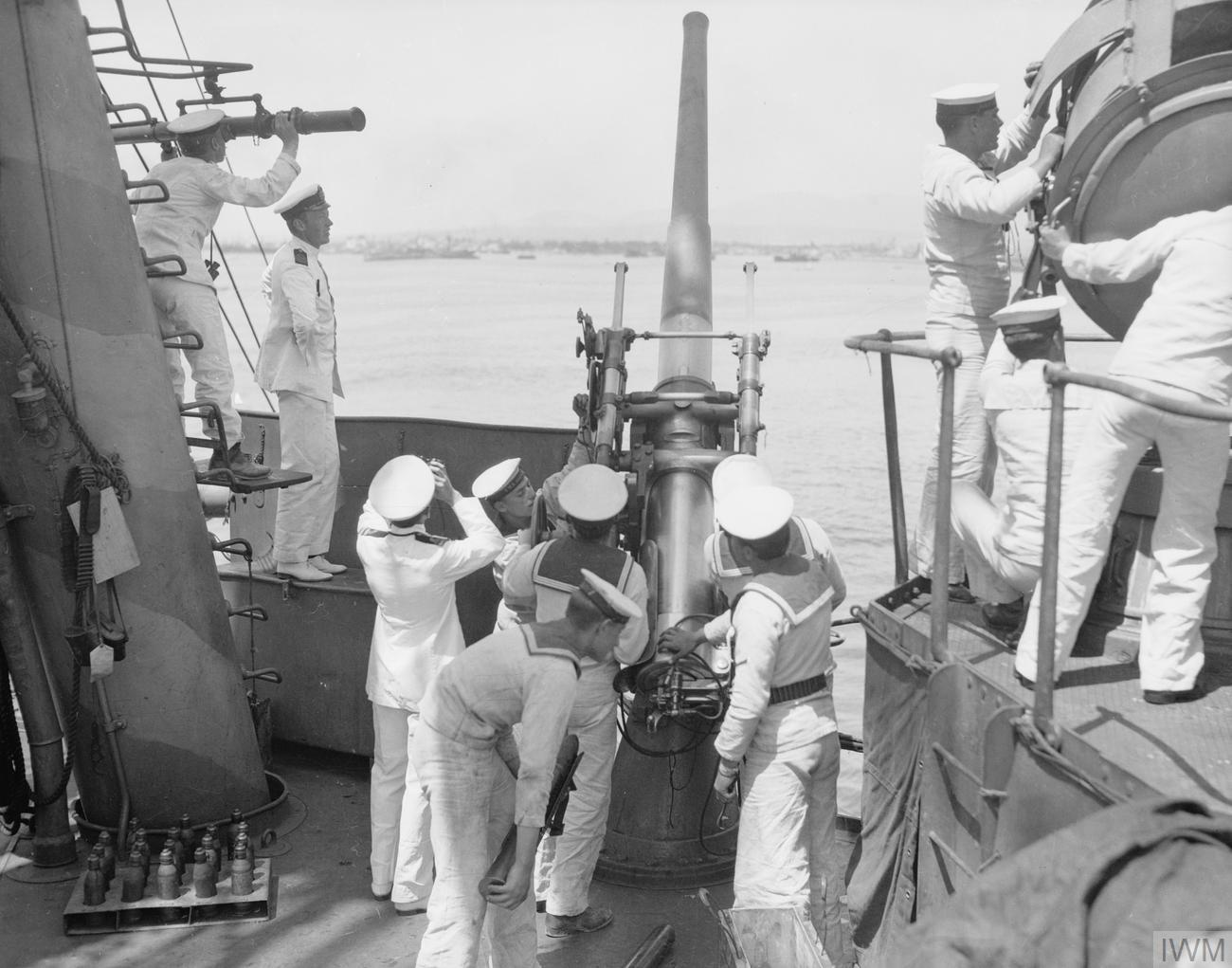
- Deployed as anti-aircraft gun on HMS Agamemnon off Salonika, 1916
- Type: Naval gun, Coastal defence
- Place of origin: United Kingdom

Service history
- In service: 1906–1921?
- Used by: Royal Navy
- Wars: World War I

Production history
- Designer: Elswick Ordnance Company
- Designed: 189?

Specifications
- Mass: Gun & breech: 2,016 lb (914 kg)
- Barrel length: Bore: 150-inch (3.81 m) (50 calibres)
- Shell: Separate QF 12.5 lb (5.66 kg)
- Calibre: 3 in (76 mm)
- Rate of fire: 20 rd/min
- Muzzle velocity: 2,600 ft/s (790 m/s)
- Effective firing range: 9,300 yards @ +20° (8,500 m @ +20°)

The QF 12 pounder 18 cwt gun (Quick-Firing) was a 3-inch high-velocity naval gun used to equip larger British warships such as battleships for defence against torpedo boats. 18 cwt referred to the weight of gun and breech (18 × 112 lb = 2,016 lb or 914 kg), to differentiate the gun from others that also fired the "12 pound" (actually 12.5 lb or 5.7 kg) shell.

== Service ==
=== Royal Navy service ===
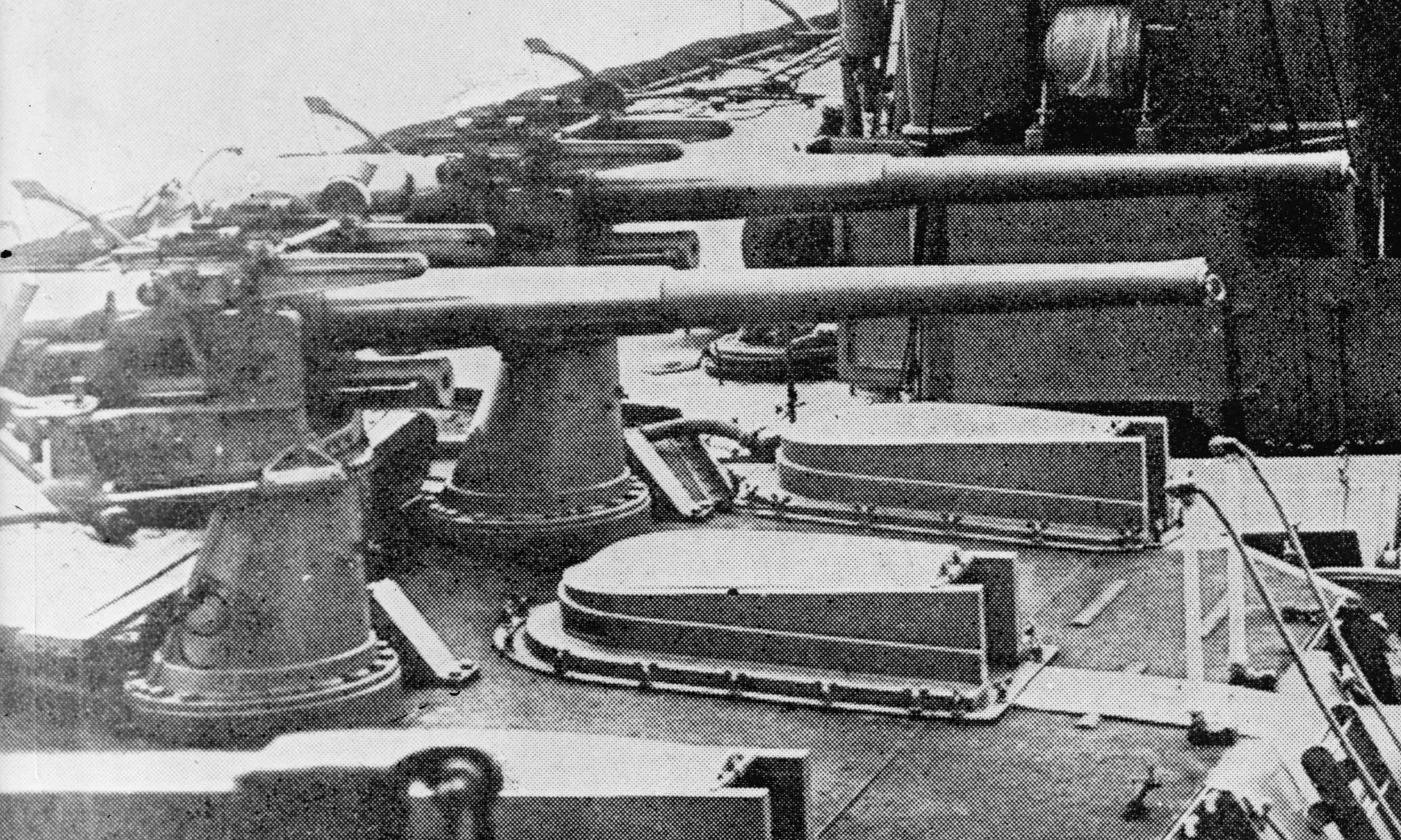
Two guns mounted on roof of "X" turret, HMS Dreadnought

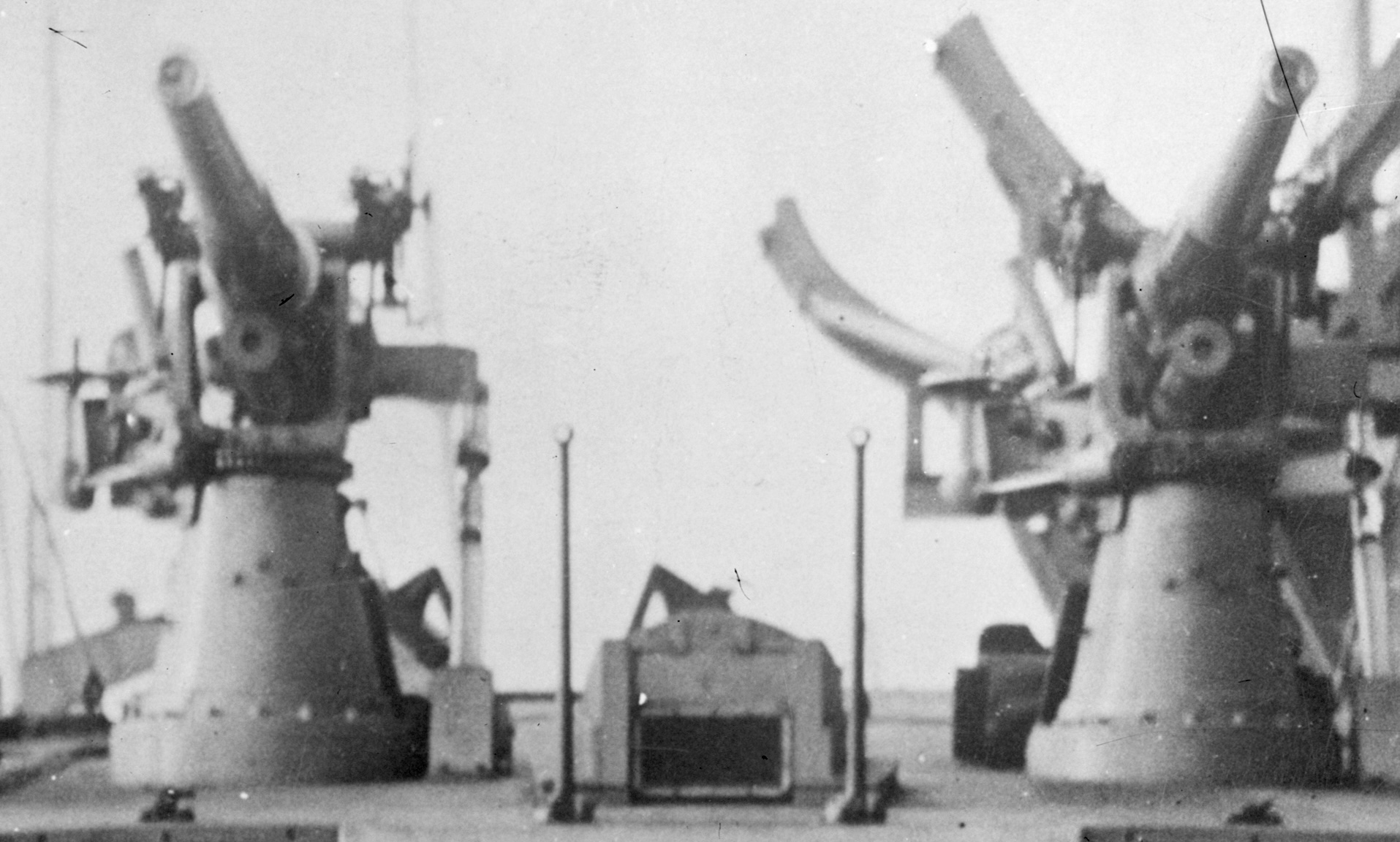
Front view, on roof of one of HMS Dreadnought's turrets

Guns were mounted in:

- HMS Dreadnought commissioned 1906
- The last three King Edward VII-class battleships—HMS Britannia, HMS Africa, and HMS Hibernia, commissioned 1906–1907
- Lord Nelson-class battleships commissioned 1908
- Minotaur-class armoured cruisers commissioned 1908–1909

The gun was superseded in the anti-torpedo boat role on new capital ships from 1909 onwards by the far more powerful BL 4-inch Mk VII gun.

=== World War I land service ===
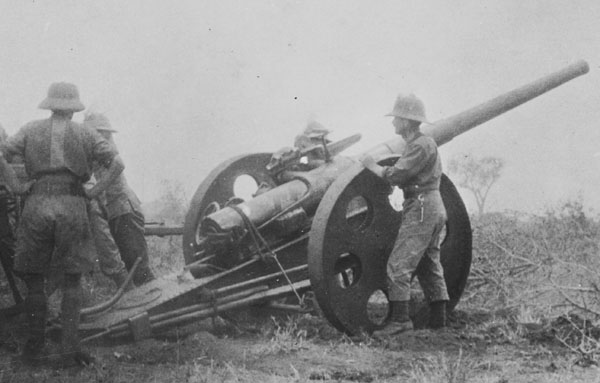
East Africa, circa 1916

In World War I four guns were landed for service in the East Africa campaign, on 10 February 1916, and were used until September. They constituted the 9th Field Battery manned by Royal Marines. They were originally towed by oxen and later by Napier lorries.

Fourteen guns (Inchcolm (8 guns), Inchmickery (4) and Cramond Island (2)), were mounted in coast defence batteries in the 'Middle Line' of the defences of the Firth of Forth when it was established in 1915. During the general revision of the defences in 1916/17 two of the guns were removed to store and four moved to other batteries (Hound Point and Downing Point). The document setting out the armaments of the Forth differentiate clearly between the 12cwt and 18cwt types, both of which were in use in the fortress.

== Ammunition ==
The gun fired the same 12.5 lb 3-inch (76 mm) shells as the other British "QF 12 pounder" guns, but used its own larger separate cartridge case to accommodate a larger quantity of cordite propellant.

2 lb 12 oz (1.25 kg) cordite Cartridge Mk II, 1914	Mk II common pointed shell	Mk II & Mk III Common Lyddite shell	Mk IV Common Lyddite shell with internal night tracer, 1914	Mk IX Shrapnel shell, 1918

== See also ==
- List of naval guns
