= Maxime Destremau =

- Maxime François Émile Destremau
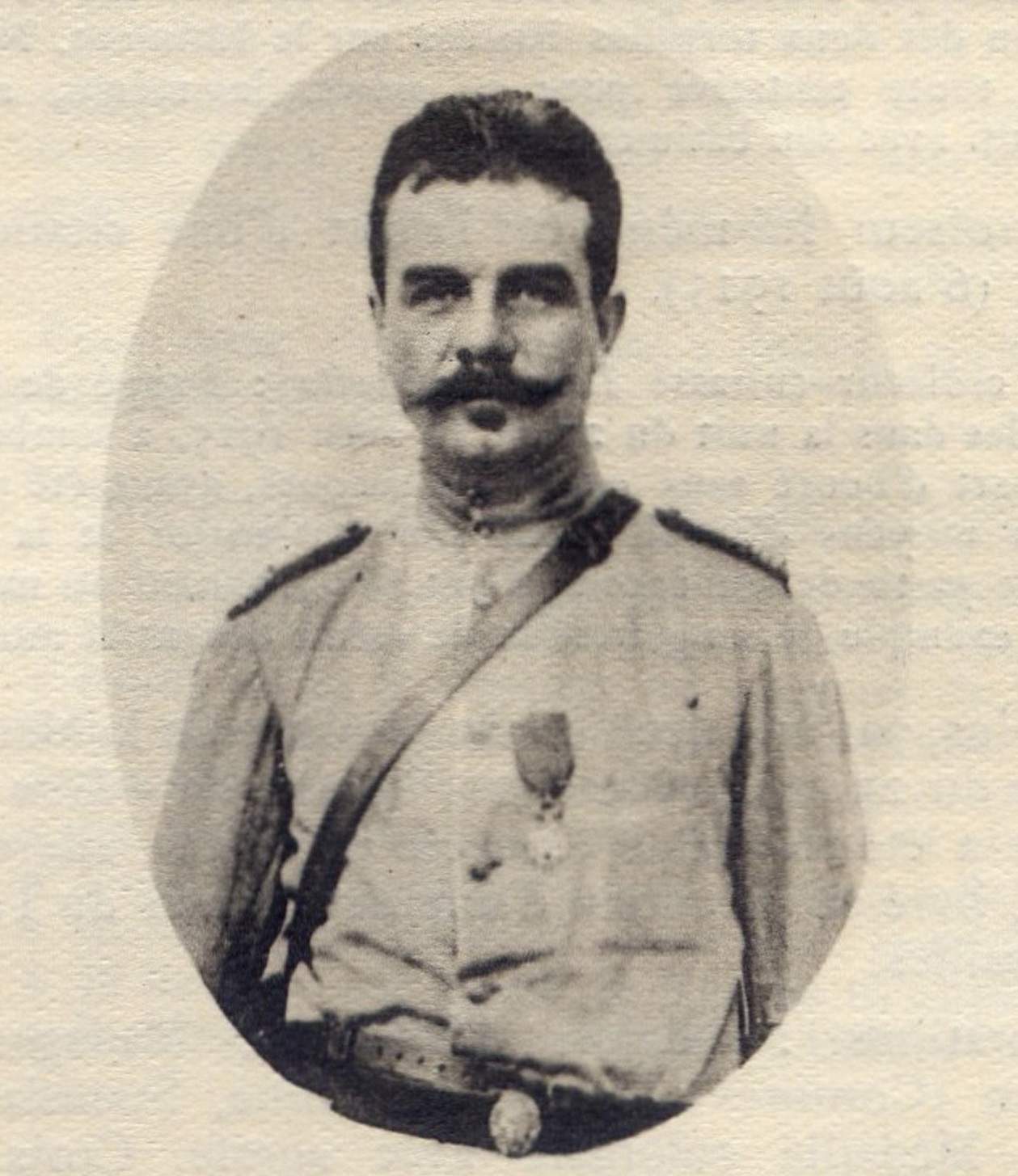
- Born: 29 March 1875; Algiers, French Algeria, France
- Died: 17 March 1915 (aged 39); Toulon, Var, France
- Burial place: Amblans-et-Velotte, Haute-Saône, France
- Education: École navale
- Military career
- Allegiance: France
- Branch: French Navy
- Service years: 1896 — 1915
- Rank: Lieutenant
- Conflicts: World War I: Asian and Pacific theatre of World War I; Bombardment of Papeete

Maxime François Émile Destremau (French pronunciation: [dɛs.tʁə.mo]) was a French naval lieutenant who served in World War I and was notable for his service during the Bombardment of Papeete.

== Biography ==
Destremau was born in Algiers in 1875, the third son of Arthur Destremau and Marie Dromard. His father as a staff officer had served in Crimea and Italy with distinction.

He was a student of the Collège Stanislas de Paris from 1885 to 1889. He entered the École navale in 1892, graduating in the ninth class. He was first assigned to the advisory-transporter Scorff (1896) and later to the cruiser Éclaireur (1897) and finally to the Eure transport aviso (1899). In 1902 he passed through the torpedo officer school, and was appointed second in command of the autonomous submersible torpedo boat Narval. He was promoted to lieutenant on 13 July 1904, and to 1st lieutenant in August 1905 and commanded the submarine Gustave-Zédé. Then on 25 September 1907 he commanded the submersible autonomous torpedo boat Pluviôse. After attending as an officer-student the École supérieure de la Marine from 1911 to December 1913, he took command of the gunboat Zélée, within the Oceania Naval Division.

In Tahiti, or known in Tahitian as "tōmānā ʻāpī" or "new commander", came into conflict at the very beginning of the First World War, with the governor William Fawtier who defended the interests of traders and refrained from arresting or expelling German or Austrian nationalists, even after having received official communication of the declaration of war. Destremau nonetheless organized the defense of the island, by landing most of the artillery of the Zélée to reinforce the coastal defenses and by training the small troop that were eligible for conscription in order to resist a possible German landing.

=== Bombardment of Papeete ===
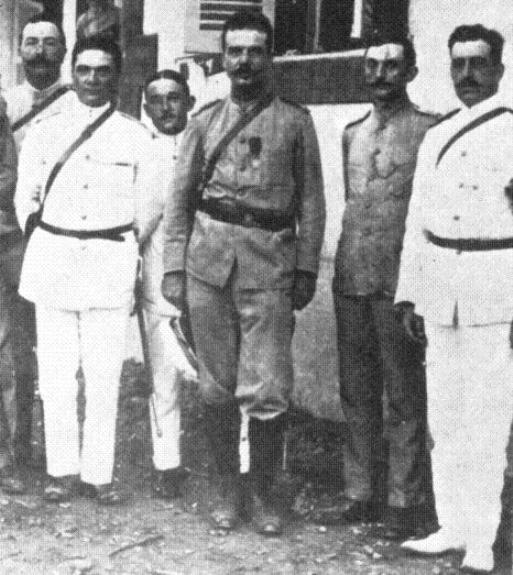
Maxime Destremau (center) and his staff in Papeete, in 1914.

Thanks to these provisions, Destremau succeeded in keeping the armoured cruisers Scharnhorst and Gneisenau at a distance when they presented themselves in front of Papeete, and to prevent the Germans from seizing the coal stock on 22 September 1914. In accordance with procedures applicable in the event of an attack by a disproportionate force, he had the Zélée scuttled and sunk. On return to France, in February 1915 he captained the destroyer Boutefeu. But he fell seriously ill and died in Toulon on 7 March 1915, from uremia, and wouldn't receive any honors until years later.

At his posthumous citation to the Order of the Army, in December 1915, "Lieutenant Destremau (Maxime-François-Émile), commanding the gunboat La Zélée and the troops at Papeete: took, on the day of 22 September 1914, the most judicious measures to ensure the defense of the port of Papeete against the attack of the German cruisers Scharnhorst and Gneisenau. Has shown in the conduct of defense operations the greatest personal bravery and military qualities of the first order which have resulted in preserving the port of Papeete and causing the retreat of enemy cruisers ", Admiral de Bon proposed in 1919 to add the attribution of the officer's rosette of the Legion of Honor with the following quote: "Lieutenant Destremau, commanding the defense of Tahiti, after the disarmament of the Zelée, was able, in spite of little help from the local authorities, to organise the defense of the island, so as to prevent the Scharnhorst and the Gneisenau from seizing it ” . This final proposal was not followed up.

He was buried in the cemetery of Amblans-et-Velotte, Haute-Saône, France.

=== Family ===
Maxime's older brother, Félix Destremau, became general at the end of the First World War. Maxime Destremau left behind six children, one of whom, Pierre, would become a captain of the vessel. The skipper Sébastien Destremau is the great-grandson of Maxime Destremau.

=== Honors and awards ===
- Knight of the Legion of Honor
- An avenue in Papeete bears his name.
