= SMS Nürnberg (1906) =

Light cruiser of the German Imperial Navy

Coordinates: 53°28′S 55°04′W

- SMS Nürnberg underway before the war

History

German Empire
- Name: Nürnberg
- Namesake: Nürnberg
- Builder: Kaiserliche Werft, Kiel
- Laid down: 16 January 1906
- Launched: 28 August 1906
- Commissioned: 10 April 1908
- Fate: Sunk at the Battle of the Falkland Islands, 8 December 1914

General characteristics
- Class & type: Königsberg-class cruiser
- Displacement: Normal: 3,469 t (3,414 long tons); Full load: 3,902 t (3,840 long tons)
- Length: 116.8 m (383 ft)
- Beam: 13.3 m (44 ft)
- Draft: 5.24 m (17.2 ft)
- Installed power: 13,200 PS (9,700 kW); 11 × water-tube boilers
- Propulsion: 2 × screw propellers; 2 × triple-expansion engines
- Speed: 23.4 knots (43.3 km/h)
- Complement: 14 Officers; 308 Enlisted men
- Armament: 10 × 10.5 cm (4.1 in) SK L/40 guns; 8 × 5.2 cm (2 in) SK guns; 2 × 45 cm (17.7 in) torpedo tubes
- Armor: Deck: 80 mm (3.1 in); Conning tower: 100 mm (3.9 in)

SMS Nürnberg ("His Majesty's Ship Nürnberg"), (Note: "SMS" stands for "Seiner Majestät Schiff", or "His Majesty's Ship".) named after the Bavarian city of Nuremberg, was a Königsberg-class light cruiser built for the German Imperial Navy (Kaiserliche Marine). Her sisters included Königsberg, Stettin, and Stuttgart. She was built by the Imperial Dockyard in Kiel, laid down in early 1906 and launched in August of that year. She was completed in April 1908. Nürnberg was armed with ten 10.5 cm (4.1 in) guns, eight 5.2 cm (2 in) SK L/55 guns, and two submerged torpedo tubes. Her top speed was 23.4 knots (43.3 km/h; 26.9 mph).

Nürnberg served with the fleet briefly, before being deployed overseas in 1910. She was assigned to the East Asia Squadron. At the outbreak of World War I in August 1914, she was returning to the German naval base at Qingdao from Mexican waters. She rejoined the rest of the Squadron, commanded by Vice Admiral Maximilian von Spee, which steamed across the Pacific Ocean and encountered a British squadron commanded by Rear Admiral Christopher Cradock. In the ensuing Battle of Coronel on 1 November, the British squadron was defeated; Nürnberg finished off the British cruiser HMS Monmouth. A month later, the Germans attempted to raid the British base in the Falkland Islands; a powerful British squadron that included a pair of battlecruisers was in port, commanded by Vice Admiral Doveton Sturdee. Sturdee's ships chased down and destroyed four of the five German cruisers; HMS Kent sank Nürnberg, with heavy loss of life.

== Design ==
The Königsberg-class ships were designed to serve both as fleet scouts in home waters and Germany's colonial empire. This was a result of budgetary constraints that prevented the Kaiserliche Marine (Imperial Navy) from building more specialized cruisers suitable for both roles. The Königsberg class was an iterative development of the preceding Bremen class. All four members of the class were intended to be identical, but after the initial vessel was begun, the design staff incorporated lessons from the Russo-Japanese War. These included internal rearrangements and a lengthening of the hull.

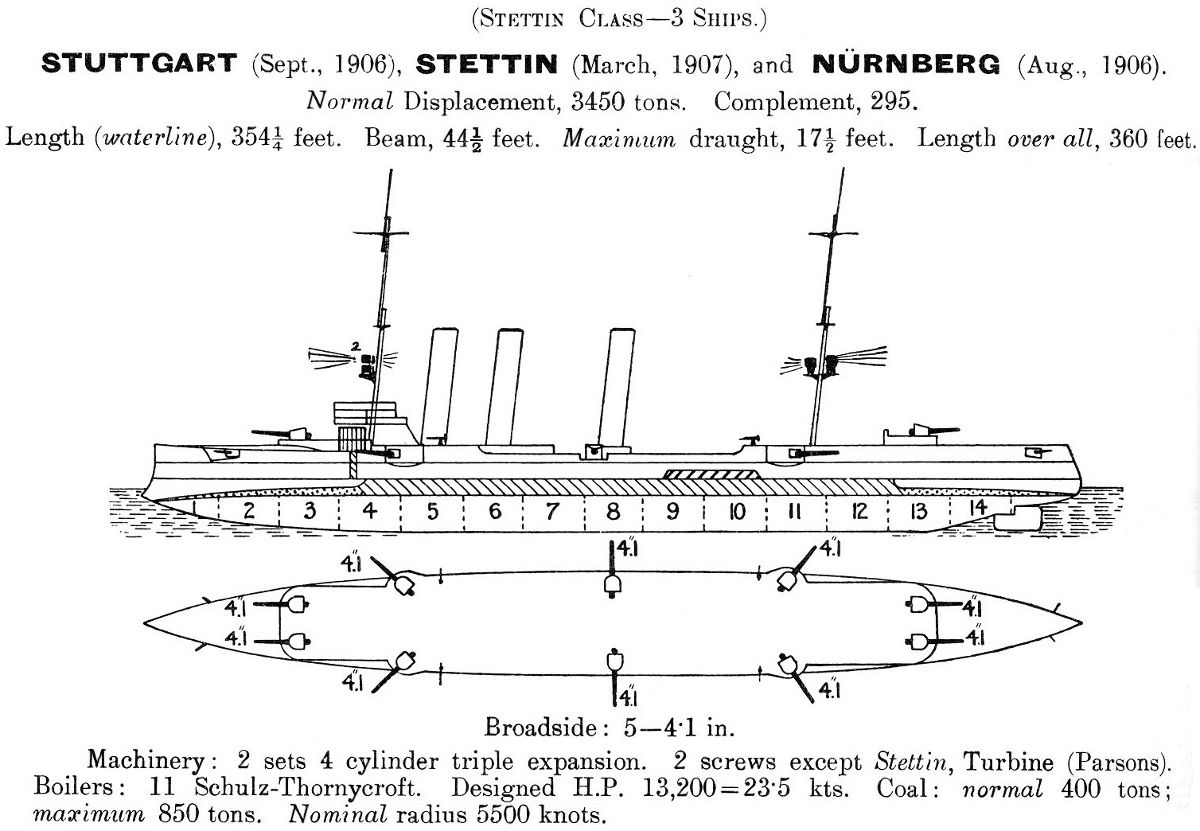
Plan and profile drawing of the Königsberg class (Note: The diagram mistakenly refers to the class as the Stettin class and does not include Königsberg)

Nürnberg was 116.8 meters (383 ft) long overall and had a beam of 13.3 m (44 ft) and a draft of 5.24 m (17.2 ft) forward. She displaced 3,469 t (3,414 long tons; 3,824 short tons) normally and up to 3,902 t (3,840 long tons; 4,301 short tons) at full load. The ship had a minimal superstructure, which consisted of a small conning tower and bridge structure. Her hull had a raised forecastle and quarterdeck, along with a pronounced ram bow. She was fitted with two pole masts. Nürnberg had a crew of 14 officers and 308 enlisted men.

Her propulsion system consisted of two 3-cylinder triple-expansion steam engines that drove a pair of screw propellers. Steam was provided by eleven coal-fired Marine-type water-tube boilers that were vented through three funnels. The ship's propulsion system was rated to produce 13,200 metric horsepower (9,700 kW) for a top speed of 23 knots (43 km/h; 26 mph), though she exceeded these figures in service. Normal coal storage amounted to 400 t (390 long tons; 440 short tons). At a more economical pace of 12 knots (22 km/h; 14 mph), the ship had a range of approximately 4,120 nautical miles (7,630 km; 4,740 mi).

The ship was armed with a main battery of ten 10.5 cm (4.1 in) SK L/40 guns in single pedestal mounts. Two were placed side by side forward on the forecastle; six were located on the broadside, three on either side; and two were side by side aft. The guns had a maximum elevation of 30 degrees, which allowed them to engage targets out to 12,700 m (41,700 ft). They were supplied with 1,500 rounds of ammunition, for 150 shells per gun. The ship was also equipped with eight 5.2 cm (2 in) SK guns with 4,000 rounds of ammunition. She was also equipped with a pair of 45 cm (17.7 in) torpedo tubes with five torpedoes submerged in the hull on the broadside.

The ship was protected by a curved armor deck that was 80 mm (3.1 in) thick amidships. The deck sloped downward at the sides, with a thickness of 45 mm (1.8 in), to provide protection against enemy fire. The conning tower sides were 100 mm (3.9 in) thick. Her main battery guns were fitted with 50 mm (2 in) thick gun shields.

== Service history ==
Nürnberg in Mexico, c. 1914

Nürnberg was ordered under the contract name "Ersatz Blitz", (Note: German warships were ordered under provisional names. Additions to the fleet were given a single letter; ships intended to replace older or lost vessels were ordered as "Ersatz (name of the ship to be replaced)".) and was laid down at the Kaiserliche Werft (Imperial Shipyard) in Kiel on 16 January 1906. Work proceeded very quickly, and her completed hull was ready for launching just six months later. At her launching ceremony on 28 August, the mayor of her namesake city, Dr. Georg von Schuh, christened Nürnberg, after which fitting-out work commenced. She was commissioned into the High Seas Fleet on 10 April 1908. She thereafter began sea trials on 30 April, which were interrupted from 4 to 5 June when the Bavarian crown prince Ludwig came aboard to visit the ship during training exercises with the High Seas Fleet. The trials were completed on 3 July, but there was a shortage of trained crews, so Nürnberg was decommissioned in Wilhelmshaven so that her crew could be used elsewhere.

Nürnberg remained out of service for the next two years before being recommissioned on 1 October 1910 for a deployment abroad. After completing her crew and making preparations for the voyage, she left Wilhelmshaven on 14 February, bound for East Asia. By 5 April, she had arrived in Singapore and thereafter entered the station area for the East Asia Squadron; she replaced the older cruiser Arcona in the unit. She spent May making visits to several ports in the region, and at the end of the month, she joined the armored cruiser Scharnhorst, the squadron flagship, for a cruise to German Samoa. The ships arrived there on 16 July, where they met the light cruiser Emden. The three cruisers then sailed south to Friedrich-Wilhelmshafen in German New Guinea to assist the survey ship Planet, which had suffered severe boiler damage. Nürnberg also carried a small police detachment in response to murders of Germans in the area, but their presence proved to be unnecessary. Nürnberg took Planet under tow to Singapore for repairs on 9 September, arriving there on 24 September without incident. Nürnberg thereafter cruised through the region for the rest of the year.

Nürnberg in Mexico, c. 1914

Nürnberg was in Hong Kong in late December when her crew received word of the Sokehs Rebellion in German Samoa. The ship quickly departed, and Emden joined her from Qingdao. The two cruisers reinforced German forces at Ponape, which included the old unprotected cruiser Cormoran. The ships bombarded rebel positions and sent a landing force, which included men from the ships along with colonial police troops, ashore in mid-January 1911. By the end of February the revolt had been suppressed, and on 26 February the unprotected cruiser Condor arrived to take over the German presence in the Carolines. Nürnberg and the other ships held a funeral the following day for those killed in the operation. Nürnberg thereafter departed to return to East Asian waters. She spent much of the rest of the year cruising in the area, individually and at times with the rest of the squadron. Following the outbreak of the Chinese Revolution in October 1911, the ship was stationed off Shanghai and Nanking from October to November 1911 to protect German nationals in the area, and again from January to April 1912.

In May and June 1912, Nürnberg embarked the squadron commander for a cruise into the Yangtze, as far inland as Hankou. In September, the ship sailed to Shanghai, where she remained through mid-October. She left for Qingdao on 13 October for a major overhaul. The rest of 1912 passed uneventfully, as did much of 1913, apart from a period from July to mid-September where Nürnberg sent a landing party ashore to protect the German consulate in Shanghai. On 16 October, while Nürnberg was in Yokohama, Japan, she received orders to sail for the western coast of Mexico in response to the Mexican Revolution. She arrived off La Paz, Mexico, on 8 November. Along with warships from the United States, Japan, and Britain, Nürnberg visited a series of ports in the region to protect German, Austro-Hungarian, and Swiss nationals in the area, but direct intervention ashore proved to be unnecessary. In June 1914, she sailed south to Panama, where she took on a new crew and supplies. Nürnberg thereafter steamed north to Mazatlán, Mexico, where she met her replacement, the light cruiser Leipzig, on 7 July. Nürnberg's boilers were in poor condition, necessitating a stop in San Francisco, United States, for repairs that lasted from 14 to 18 July.

=== World War I ===
After completing repairs in the United States, Nürnberg was to sail via Hawaii to Apia, where she was to meet Scharnhorst and the armored cruiser Gneisenau, but due to the deteriorating political situation in Europe that resulted from the assassination of Archduke Franz Ferdinand and led to the July Crisis and ultimately the start of World War I, the German naval command ordered Nürnberg to sail directly to Qingdao. Her orders were changed again while still en route, and she met the two armored cruisers, by then commanded by Vice Admiral Maximilian von Spee, in Ponape. On 6 August 1914, Nürnberg rendezvoused with the two cruisers. With the outbreak of war at the end of July, Spee planned a return of his squadron to Germany, sailing through the Pacific, rounding Cape Horn, and then forcing his way north through the Atlantic. Spee decided the best place to concentrate his forces was Pagan Island in the northern Marianas Islands, a German possession in the central Pacific. All available colliers, supply ships, and passenger liners were ordered to meet the East Asia Squadron there. On 11 August, Spee arrived in Pagan; he was joined by several supply ships, as well as Emden and the auxiliary cruiser Prinz Eitel Friedrich.

The four cruisers then departed the central Pacific, bound for Chile. On 13 August the captain of the Emden, Commodore Karl von Müller, persuaded Spee to detach his ship for commerce raiding. The ships again coaled after their arrival at Enewetak Atoll in the Marshall Islands on 20 August. On 6 September Spee detached Nürnberg, along with the tender Titania, to cut the British cable system at Fanning Island. The cruiser flew a French ensign to deceive the defenders, and succeeded in destroying the station on 7 September. Nürnberg then rejoined the fleet at Christmas Island later that day. In order to keep the German high command informed of his activities, Spee sent Nürnberg on 8 September to Honolulu to send word through neutral countries. Spee chose the ship because the British were aware she had left Mexican waters, and so her presence in Hawaii would not betray the movements of the entire East Asia Squadron. She was also ordered to contact German agents to instruct them to prepare coal stocks in South America for the squadron's use. Nürnberg brought back news of the Allied conquest of the German colony at Samoa.

On 14 September, Spee decided to use his two armored cruisers to raid the British base at Apia; he sent Nürnberg to escort the squadron's colliers to the rendezvous location. At the Battle of Papeete on 22 September, Nürnberg and the rest of the East Asia Squadron bombarded the colony. During the bombardment, the French gunboat Zélée was sunk by gunfire from the German ships. Fear of mines in the harbor prevented Spee from seizing the coal that lay in the harbor. By 12 October, the squadron had reached Easter Island. There they were joined by Dresden and Leipzig, which had sailed from American waters. After a week in the area, the ships departed for Chile.

==== Battle of Coronel ====
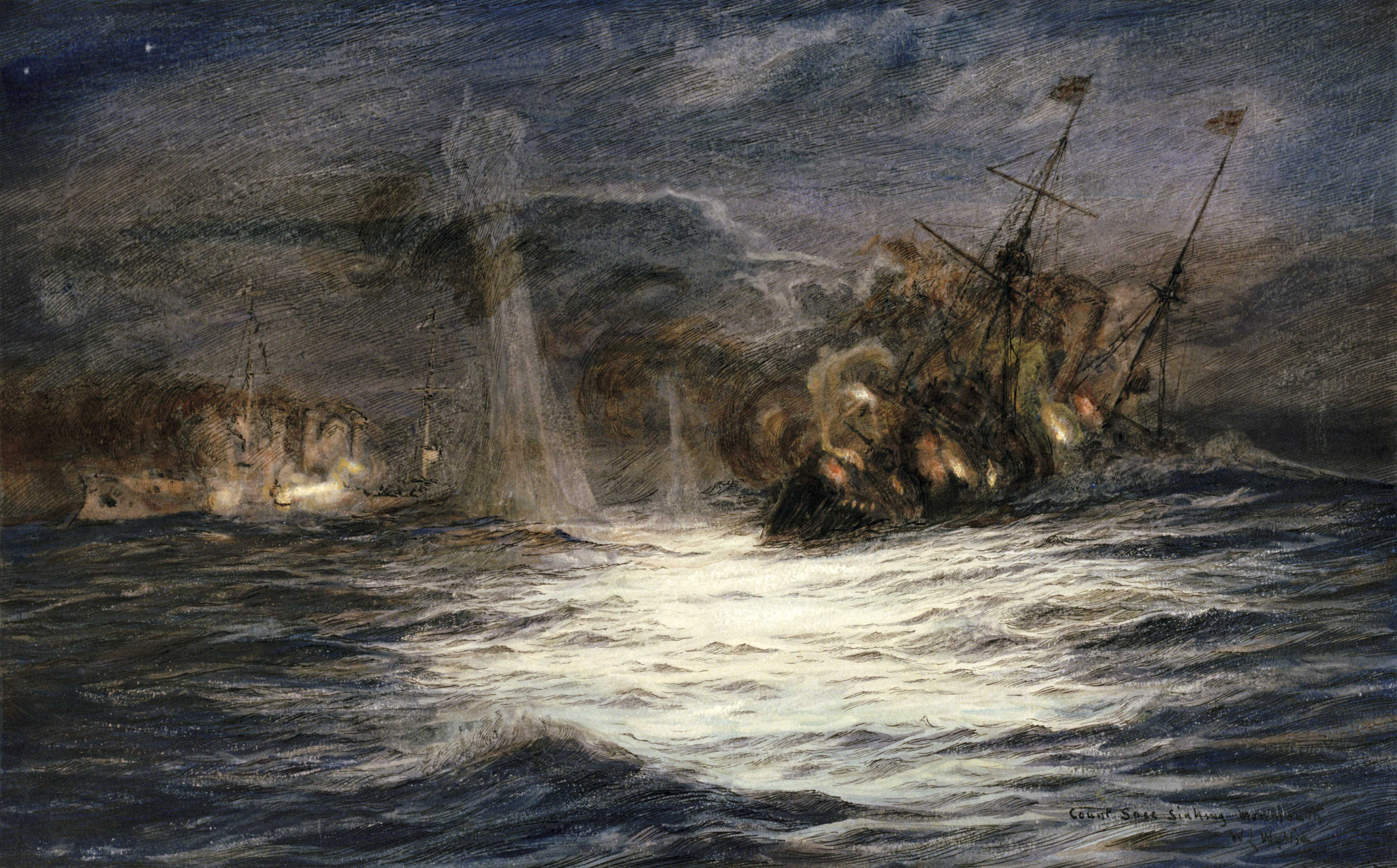
Nürnberg (left) sinking HMS Monmouth (right) at Coronel

To oppose the German squadron off the coast of South America, the British had scant resources; under the command of Rear Admiral Christopher Cradock were the armored cruisers HMS Good Hope and Monmouth, the light cruiser Glasgow, and the auxiliary cruiser Otranto. This flotilla was reinforced by the elderly pre-dreadnought battleship Canopus and the armored cruiser Defence, the latter, however, did not arrive until after the Battle of Coronel. Canopus was left behind by Cradock, who likely felt that her slow speed would prevent him from bringing the German ships to battle. On the evening of 26 October, the East Asia Squadron steamed out of Mas a Fuera, Chile, and headed eastward. Spee learned that Glasgow had been spotted in Coronel on the 31st, and so turned towards the port.

He arrived on the afternoon of 1 November, and to his surprise, encountered Good Hope, Monmouth, and Otranto as well as Glasgow. Canopus was still some 300 miles (480 km) behind, with the British colliers. At 17:00, Glasgow spotted the Germans; Cradock formed a line with Good Hope in the lead, followed by Monmouth, Glasgow, and Otranto in the rear. Spee decided to hold off on engaging the British until the sun had set more, at which point the British ships would be silhouetted by the sun. Nürnberg was some distance behind the rest of the German squadron, and joined the ensuing action later; she had been delayed from searches of neutral steamers. Arriving late to the battle, Nürnberg found the drifting Monmouth and finished her off with gunfire at a range of around 550 to 900 m (600 to 980 yd).

==== Voyage to the Falklands ====
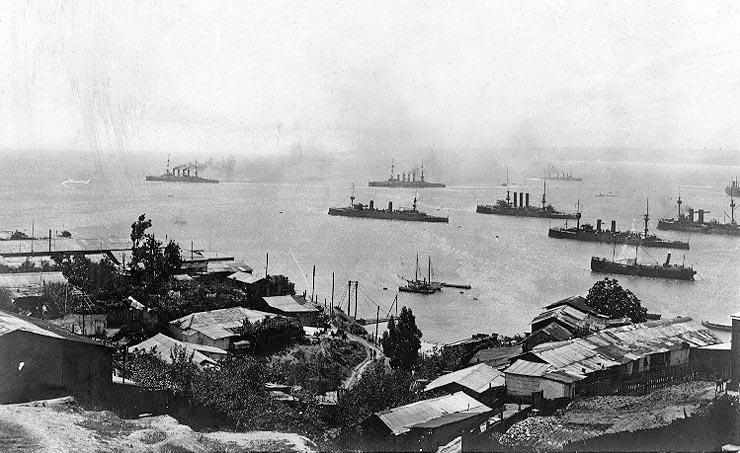
The German squadron leaving Valparaíso on 3 November after the battle, Scharnhorst and Gneisenau in the lead and Nürnberg following. In the middle distance are a group of Chilean warships

After the battle, Spee took his ships north to Valparaiso. Since Chile was neutral, only three ships could enter the port at a time; Spee took Scharnhorst, Gneisenau, and Nürnberg in first visit on the morning of 3 November, leaving Dresden and Leipzig with the colliers at Mas a Fuera. In Valparaiso, Spee's ships could take on coal while he conferred with the Admiralty Staff in Germany to determine the strength of remaining British forces in the region. The ships remained in the port for only 24 hours, in accordance with the neutrality restrictions, and arrived at Mas a Fuera on 6 November, where they took on more coal from captured British and French steamers. On 10 November, Dresden and Leipzig were detached for a stop in Valparaiso, and five days later, Spee took the rest of the squadron south to St. Quentin Bay in the Gulf of Penas. On 18 November, Dresden and Leipzig met Spee while en route and the squadron reached St. Quentin Bay three days later. There, they took on more coal, since the voyage around Cape Horn would be a long one and it was unclear when they would have another opportunity to coal.

Once word of the defeat reached London, the Royal Navy set to organizing a force to hunt down and destroy the East Asia Squadron. To this end, the powerful battlecruisers Invincible and Inflexible were detached from the Grand Fleet and placed under the command of Vice Admiral Doveton Sturdee. The two ships left Devonport on 10 November and while en route to the Falkland Islands, they were joined by the armored cruisers Carnarvon, Kent, and Cornwall, the light cruisers Bristol and Glasgow, and the armed merchant cruiser Macedonia. The force of eight ships reached the Falklands by 7 December, where they immediately coaled.

In the meantime, Spee's ships departed St. Quentin Bay on 26 November and rounded Cape Horn on 2 December. They captured the Canadian barque Drummuir, which had a cargo of 2,500 t (2,500 long tons) of good-quality Cardiff coal. Leipzig took the ship under tow and the following day the ships stopped off Picton Island. The crews transferred the coal from Drummuir to the squadron's colliers. On the morning of 6 December, Spee held a conference with the ship commanders aboard Scharnhorst to determine their next course of action. The Germans had received numerous fragmentary and contradictory reports of British reinforcements in the region; Spee and two other captains favored an attack on the Falklands, while three other commanders argued that it would be better to bypass the islands and attack British shipping off Argentina. Spee's opinion carried the day and the squadron departed for the Falklands at 12:00.

==== Battle of the Falkland Islands ====
Map showing the movements of the British and German ships during the battle

Gneisenau and Nürnberg were delegated for the attack; they approached the Falklands the following morning, with the intention of destroying the wireless transmitter there. Observers aboard Gneisenau spotted smoke rising from Port Stanley, but assumed it was the British burning their coal stocks to prevent the Germans from seizing them. As they closed on the harbor, 30.5 cm (12 in) shells from Canopus, which had been beached as a guard ship, began to fall around the German ships. Lookouts on the German ships spotted the large tripod masts of the battlecruisers, though these were initially believed to be from the battlecruiser HMAS Australia; the reports of several enemy warships combined with fire from Canopus prompted Spee to break off the attack. The Germans took a southeasterly course at 22 kn (41 km/h; 25 mph) after having reformed by 10:45. Spee formed his line with Gneisenau and Nürnberg ahead, Scharnhorst in the center, and Dresden and Leipzig astern. The fast battlecruisers quickly got up steam and sailed out of the harbor to pursue the East Asia Squadron. Spee realized his armored cruisers could not escape the much faster battlecruisers and ordered the three light cruisers to attempt to break away while he turned about and allowed the British battlecruisers to engage the outgunned Scharnhorst and Gneisenau. In response, Sturdee sent his light cruisers to chase down Nürnberg, Dresden, and Leipzig.

Kent chased Nürnberg down; at 17:00, Nürnberg opened fire at extreme range, approximately 11,000 m (12,000 yd). Kent was unable to reply until the range fell to 6,400 m (7,000 yd), at which time she began firing salvos rapidly. Nürnberg turned to port in order to bring her entire broadside into action, which was mimicked by Kent. The two ships steered on converging courses, and the distance between the two cruisers dropped to 2,700 m (3,000 yd). By that time, Kent's shells were raining down on Nürnberg and were causing major damage. A serious fire broke out forward at 18:02, and by 18:35, she was dead in the water and had ceased firing. Kent temporarily ceased fire, but after noticing Nürnberg was still flying her battle ensigns, resumed combat. After five more minutes of shelling, Nürnberg struck her colors, and Kent's crew prepared to lower lifeboats to pick up survivors.

Only twelve men were picked up before the ship capsized and sank at 19:26, and five of them died after being rescued. Among the dead was one of Spee's sons, Otto von Spee. In total, 327 officers and men were killed in the battle. In the course of the engagement, Nürnberg had hit Kent thirty-eight times, but did not cause significant damage. One shell struck one of Kent's casemate guns and ignited the propellant charges inside, but the magazine was flooded before the fire could destroy the ship. The sinking was commemorated in a painting entitled The Last Man by Hans Bohrdt, which depicted a German sailor waving the Imperial ensign as Nürnberg slipped beneath the waves.

== Footnotes ==
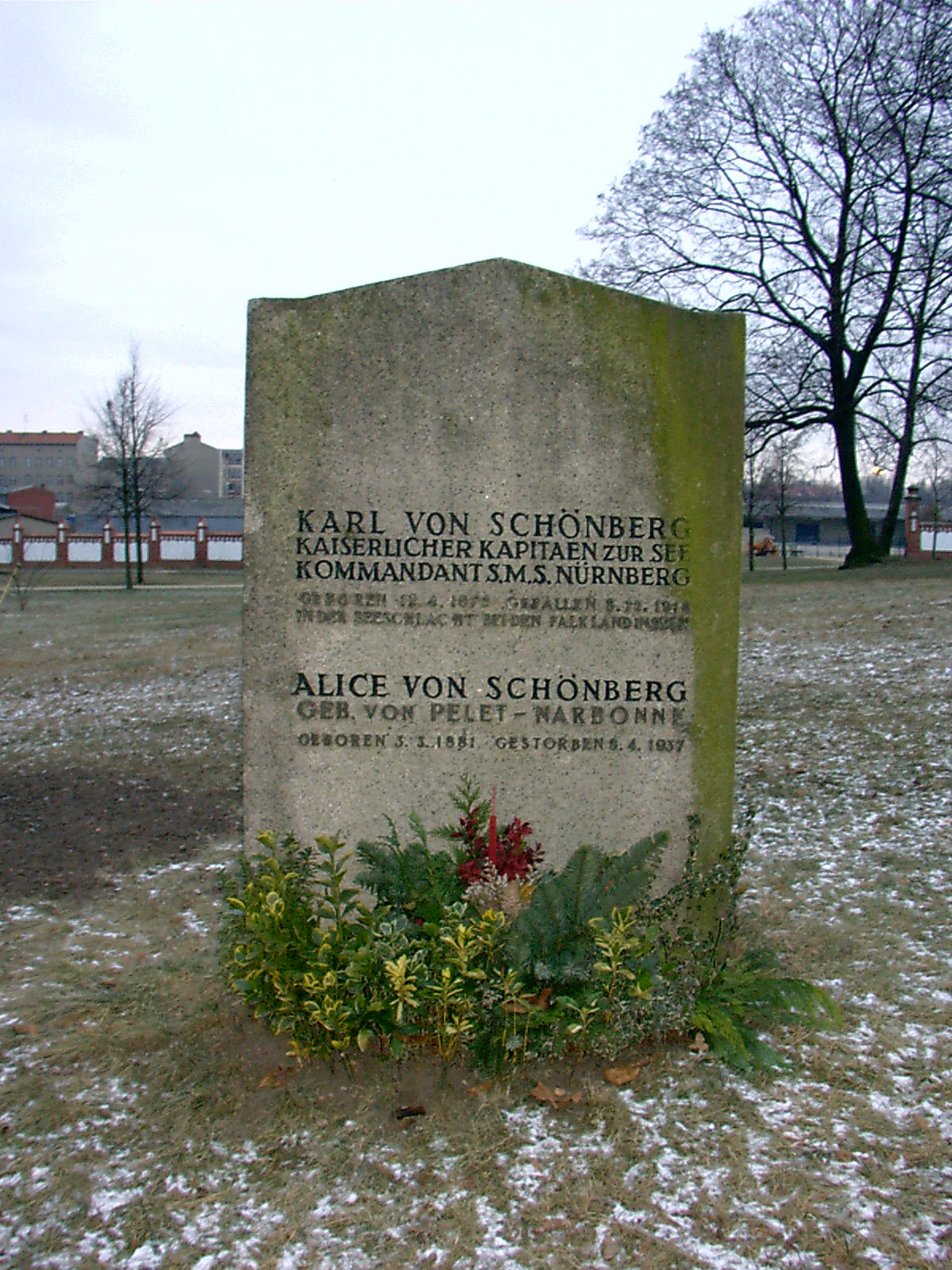
Memorial to Captain Karl von Schönberg, the commander of Nürnberg and killed during the battle
