= Bombardment of Papeete =

First World War battle in French Polynesia

- Part of Asian and Pacific theatre of World War I
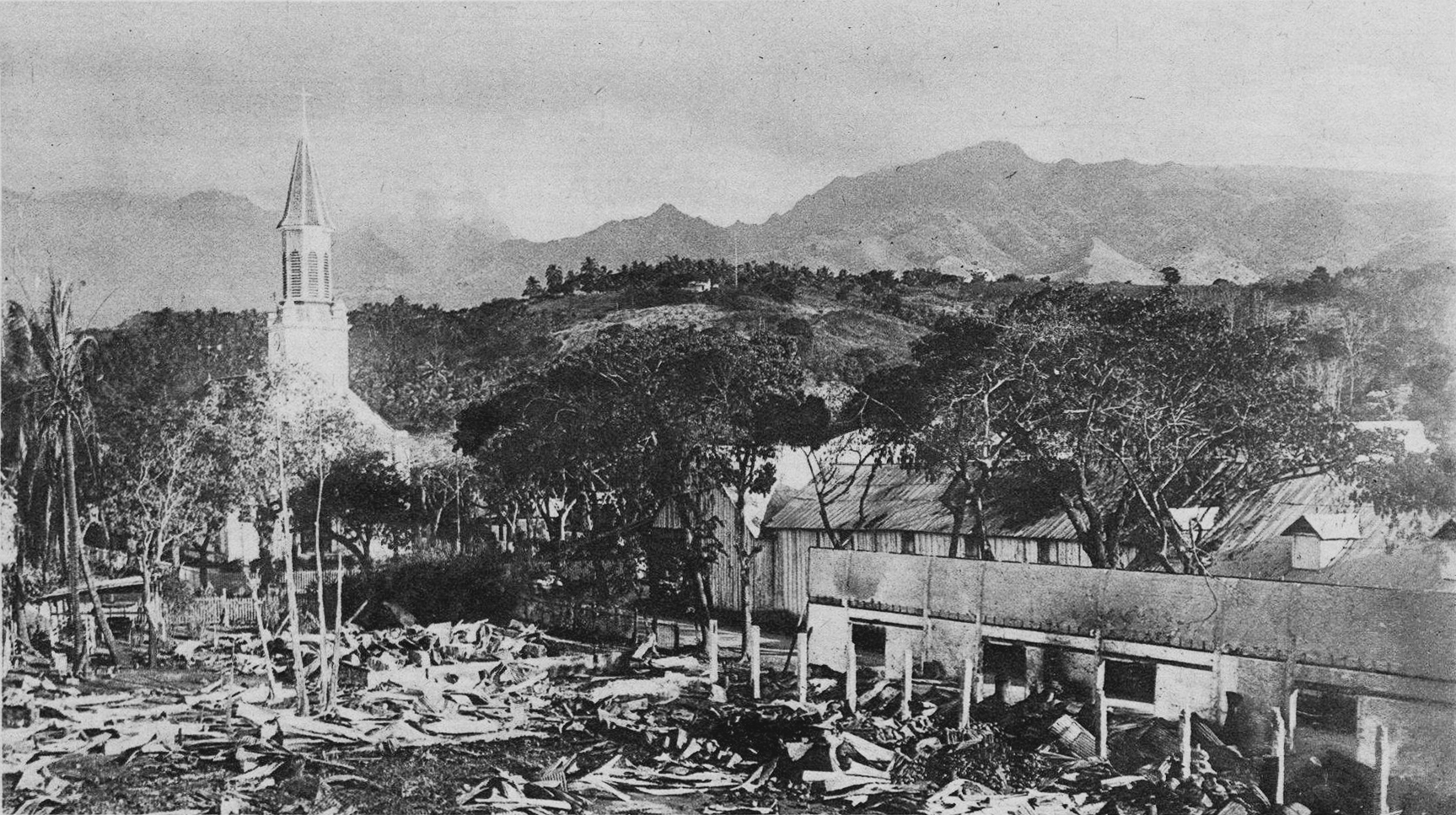
- Buildings in the city of Papeete destroyed by German shore bombardment.
Date	22 September 1914
Location	off Papeete, French Polynesia, Pacific Ocean 17.53°S 149.57°W
Result	German victory: French ships sunk; Coal piles not captured, destroyed by the French

Belligerents
France	Germany

Commanders and leaders
(French Third Republic) Maxime Destremau	(German Empire) Maximilian von Spee

Strength
Land: 160 infantry 2 shore batteries Sea: 1 gunboat 1 freighter	2 armored cruisers

Casualties and losses
1 gunboat sunk 1 freighter sunk Papeete severely damaged	None
- Civilian casualties: 2 killed

Scharnhorst's and Gneisenau's path across the Pacific.

The Bombardment of Papeete occurred in French Polynesia when German warships attacked on 22 September 1914, during World War I. The German armoured cruisers SMS Scharnhorst and Gneisenau entered the port of Papeete on the island of Tahiti and sank the French gunboat Zélée and freighter Walküre before bombarding the town's fortifications. French shore batteries and a gunboat resisted the German intrusion but were greatly outgunned. The main German objective was to seize the coal piles stored on the island, but these were destroyed by the French at the start of the action.

The German vessels were largely undamaged but the French lost their gunboat. Several of Papeete's buildings were destroyed and the town's economy was severely disrupted. The main strategic consequence of the engagement was the disclosure of the cruisers' positions to the British Admiralty, which led to the Battle of Coronel where the entire German East Asia Squadron defeated a Royal Navy squadron. The depletion of Scharnhorst's and Gneisenau's ammunition at Papeete also contributed to their subsequent destruction at the Battle of the Falklands.

== Background ==
Word of war reached Admiral Maximilian von Spee—of the German East Asia Squadron—while at Ponape (17 July – 6 August). He concentrated the majority of his squadron at Pagan Island in the nearby Mariana Islands, and then steamed off into the Pacific with the Scharnhorst-class armored cruisers SMS Scharnhorst and Gneisenau, the Königsberg-class light cruiser SMS Nürnberg, the auxiliary cruiser SMS Titania, and several colliers at his disposal. Nürnberg and Titania were sent to gather intelligence at Hawaii and raid the cable station at Fanning Island. Spee then learned that Australian and New Zealand forces had captured German Samoa, and he sailed off in his flagship Scharnhorst—along with her sister ship Gneisenau—to engage what Allied forces they could find there. Failing to catch the Samoa Expeditionary Force at Apia and having seen no action at all since leaving Pagan Island, the men of Spee's armored cruisers were eager to meet the enemy in battle.

Spee decided to raid Papeete in Tahiti on his way to rendezvous with the rest of his squadron at Easter Island. The French held over 5,000 t (5,500 short tons) of high-quality Cardiff coal at the port, and Spee hoped to seize the coal piles to replenish his squadron's supply. Additionally, Spee aimed at destroying what allied shipping he could find in the harbour, and thought the raid might help raise his men's morale. Spee intended to coal at Suwarrow Atoll before sailing to Papeete, but was prevented by foul weather. Instead, Spee decided to take Scharnhorst and Gneisenau and attempt to resupply at Bora Bora while Nürnberg and Titania were dispatched to Nuku Hiva to guard the fleet's colliers. The German admiral intended to keep his vessels' identities secret by disguising them as French ships, flying French flags, and only allowing French- and English-speaking members of his crew contact with the Frenchmen present there. Spee managed to replenish his food stores using gold seized by Titania and Nürnberg during their raid of Fanning, and was able to discover the strength of the French military in the region as well as the exact size and positions of the coal piles at Papeete.

The French had no heavy defenses at Papeete but had been warned that Spee's squadron might raid Tahiti and that a German squadron had been sighted off Samoa. Although Papeete was the capital of the French Settlements in Oceania, by 1914 it had become a colonial backwater, lacking a wireless station and having a garrison of only 25 colonial infantry and 20 gendarmes. In order to bolster the town's defenses, Lieutenant Maxime Destremau—commander of the old wooden gunboat Zélée and the ranking officer at Papeete—had his ship's 100 mm (3.9 in) stern gun and all of her 65 mm (2.6 in) and 37 mm (1.5 in) guns removed from his vessel and placed ashore to be used in place of Papeete's antiquated land batteries. Several Ford trucks were turned into impromptu armored cars by mounting them with Zélée's 37 mm guns and 160 sailors and marines drilled in preparation to repel any German attempt at landing. Zélée retained only her 100 mm bow gun and 10 men under the ship's second in command. In addition to the gunboat and harbor fortifications, the French also had at Papeete the unarmed German freighter Walküre, which had been captured by Zélée at the start of the war. Despite the French preparations, the two German cruisers were more than a match for the forces Destremau commanded at Papeete. Both Scharnhorst and Gneisenau heavily outgunned Zélée, each being armed with eight 210 mm (8.3 in) guns, six 150 mm (5.9 in) guns, eighteen 88 mm (3.5 in) guns, and four torpedo tubes. Spee's forces also outnumbered the French with over 1,500 sailors aboard their vessels, more than enough to form a landing party and overwhelm the forces Destremau had to oppose them.

== Battle ==
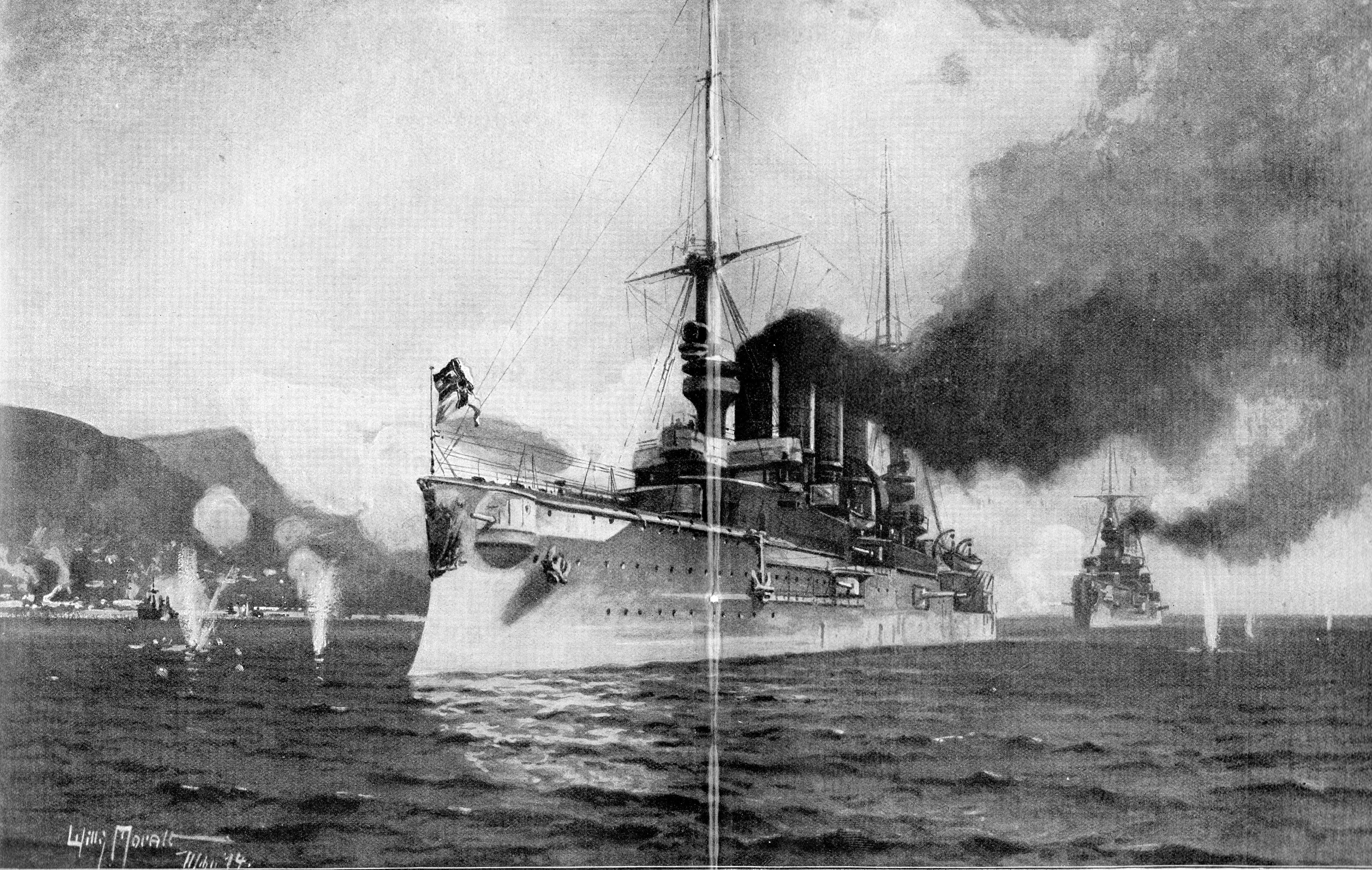
Gneisenau and Scharnhorst shelling Papeete.

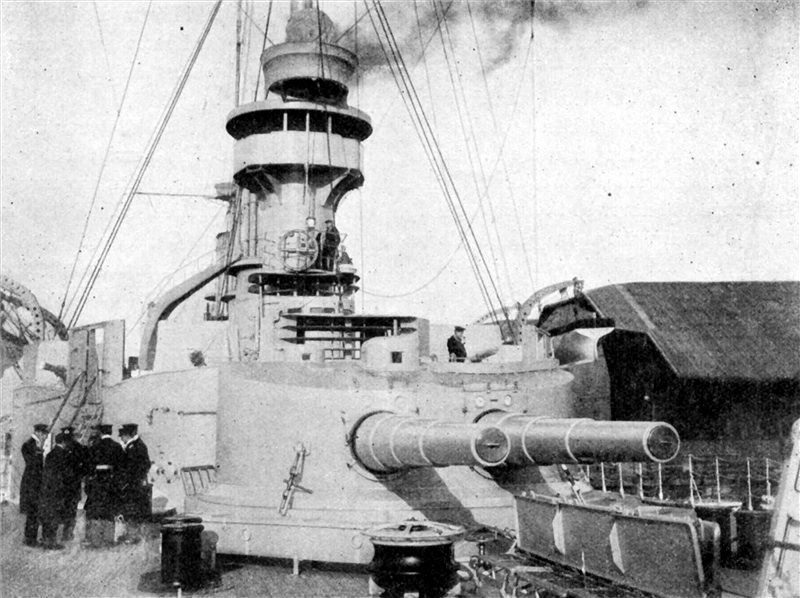
One of the turrets of Scharnhorst's main battery.

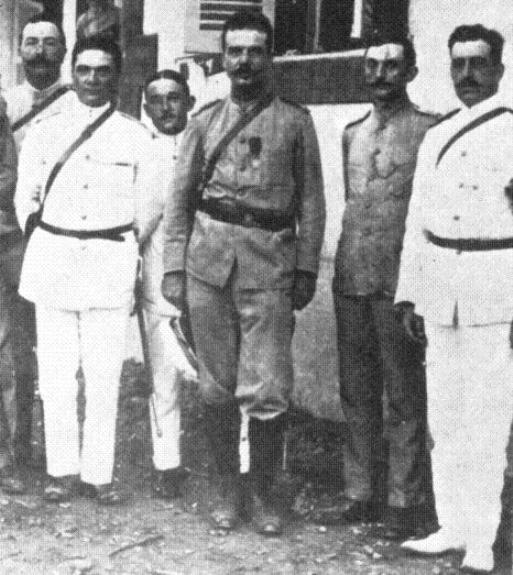
Captain Maxime Destremau (center) and his staff in Papeete in 1914.

At 07:00 on 22 September 1914, the French sighted two unidentified cruisers approaching the harbor of Papeete. The alarm was raised, the harbor's signal beacons destroyed, and three warning shots were fired by the French batteries to signal the approaching cruisers that they must identify themselves. The cruisers replied with a shot of their own and raised the German colors, signaling the town to surrender. The French refused the German demands, and Spee's vessels began to shell the shore batteries and town from a distance of 6,000 m (6,600 yd). The land batteries and the gunboat in the harbor returned fire but scored no hits on the armored cruisers. Having difficulty in discovering the exact position of the French batteries, the German cruisers soon turned their attention to the French shipping in the harbor.

The French commander—Destremau—had ordered the coal piles burned at the start of the action and now smoke began billowing over the town. Zélée and Walküre were sighted and fired upon by the Germans. The French had begun to scuttle their vessels when the action had begun, but both were still afloat when Scharnhorst and Gneisenau began firing upon them and finished the two ships off. By now, most of the Papeete's inhabitants had fled and the town had caught fire from the German shelling, with two blocks of Papeete set alight. With the coal piles destroyed and the threat of mines in the harbor, Spee saw no meaningful purpose in making a landing. Accordingly, the German admiral withdrew his ships from Papeete's harbor by 11:00. After leaving Papeete, the ships steamed out towards Nuku Hiva to meet Nürnberg, Titania, and colliers waiting there.

== Aftermath ==
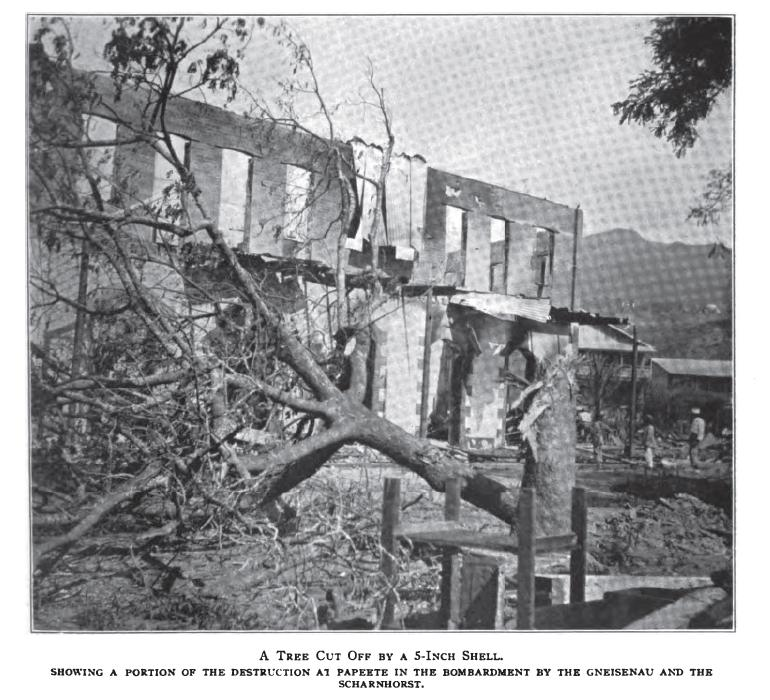
Some of the damage done to the town of Papeete after it was bombarded by the Germans.

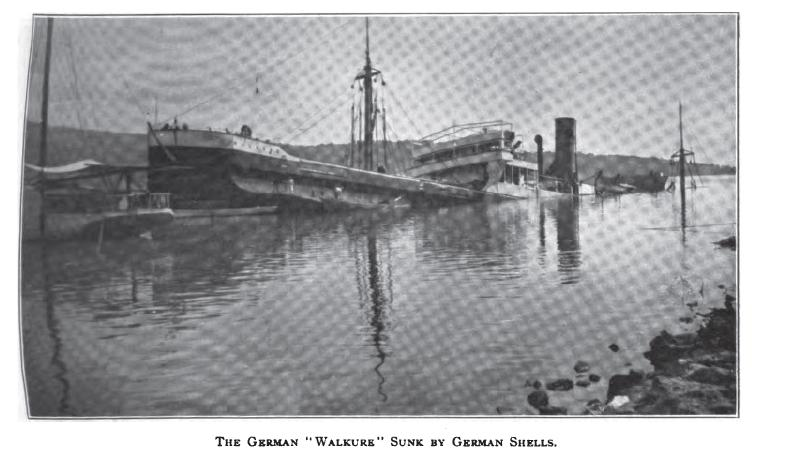
Picture of a battle damaged freighter half-sunk in shallow water

By the time Spee withdrew his ships, large portions of the town had been destroyed. Two entire blocks of Papeete had burnt to the ground before the fires were finally put out. A copra store, a market, and several other buildings and residences were among those destroyed by the shellfire and resulting inferno. While the majority of Papeete's civilians fled to the interior of the island as soon as the fighting began, a Japanese civilian and a Polynesian boy were both killed by German shellfire. Although the two French vessels in the harbor had been sunk, there were no military casualties on either side and the German vessels took no damage. Overall, the bombardment was estimated in 1915 to have caused over 2 million francs' worth of property damage, some of which was recouped through the seizure of a German store on the island. In addition to the seizure of their property, several local Germans were interned and forced to repair the damage Spee's squadron had caused. Perhaps the most lasting effect of the bombardment on the French was the dramatic fall of copra prices in the region, as local suppliers had previously sold a majority of their produce to German merchants in the area who were now interned. Further havoc and distress spread throughout the island 18 days after Spee's squadron had left when rumors started to spread that a second German bombardment was about to begin.

After withdrawing, Scharnhorst and Gneisenau rendezvoused with Nürnberg and Titania at Nuku Hiva, where they resupplied and their crews took shore leave before moving on to meet the rest of the squadron at Easter Island. Although the Germans had destroyed the shipping at Papeete and wreaked havoc in the town, they had been denied their primary objective of seizing the French coal piles and replenishing their own stocks. Spee's raid allowed the British Admiralty to receive word on his position and heading, allowing them to inform Rear Admiral Christopher Cradock of the German intentions thus leading to the Battle of Coronel. Another effect was the reduction of ammunition available to the two German cruisers. The hundreds of shells fired by Spee's ships at Papeete were irreplaceable. The depletion of ammunition as a result of the action at Papeete contributed to the German East Asia Squadron's failure to adequately defend itself at the Battle of the Falkland Islands against British battlecruisers. Lieutenant Destremau was chastised by his misinformed superior officer for his actions during the defense of Papeete and for the loss of the gunboat Zélée. He was summoned back to Toulon under arrest to be court-martialled but died of illness in 1915 before the trial. In 1918, Destremau was finally recognized for his actions at Papeete and was posthumously awarded the Légion d'honneur.
