= Battle of Coronel =

Naval battle of 1 November 1914 near Chile in World War I

- Part of the First World War
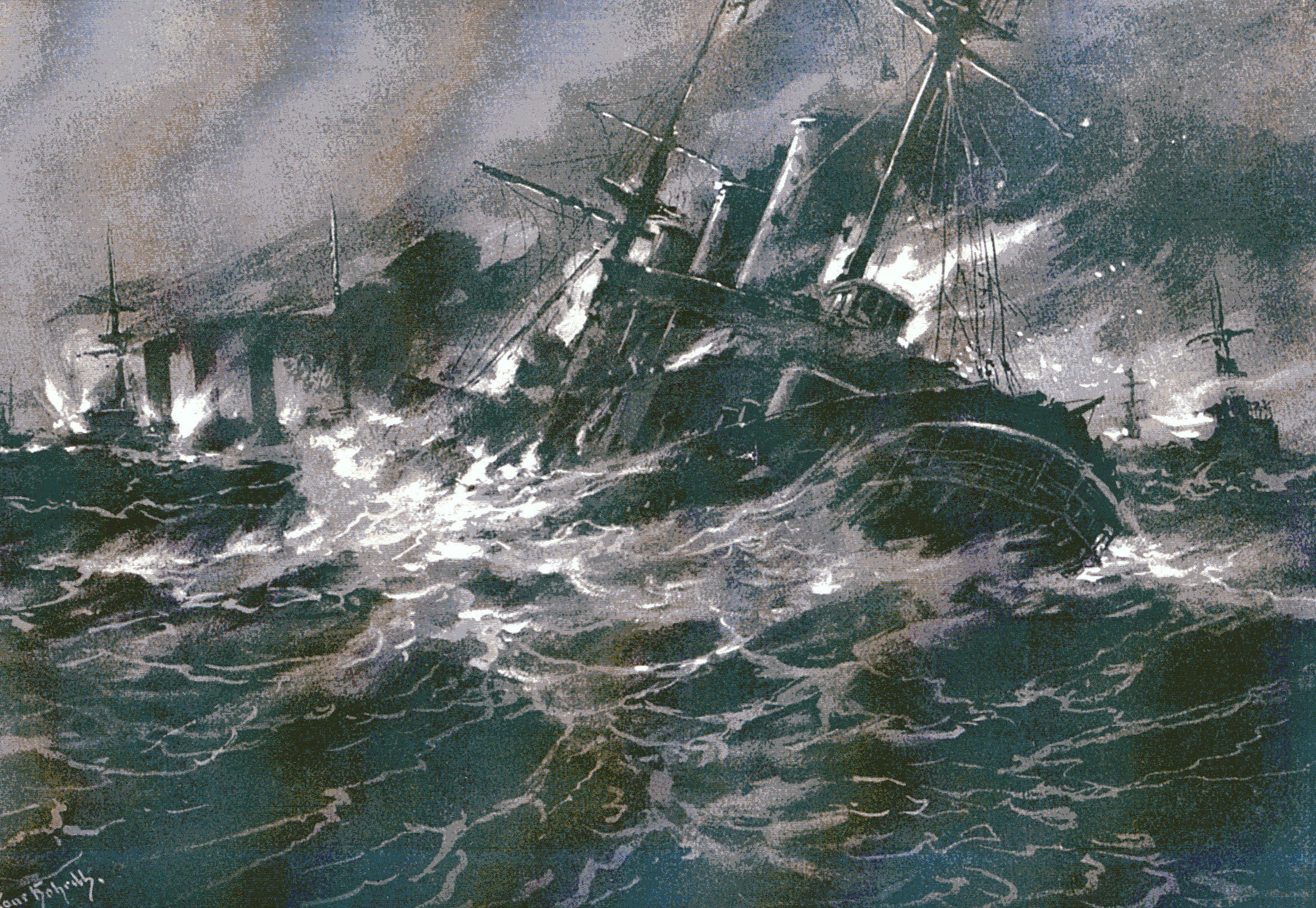
- Die Seeschlacht bei Coronel, Hans Bohrdt
Date	1 November 1914
Location	Off Coronel, Chile 36°59′1″S 73°48′49″W
Result	German victory

Belligerents
German Empire	United Kingdom

Commanders and leaders
Maximilian von Spee	Christopher Cradock †; John Luce

Strength
2 armoured cruisers 3 light cruisers	2 armoured cruisers 1 light cruiser 1 auxiliary cruiser

Casualties and losses
3 wounded	1,660 killed 2 armoured cruisers sunk 1 light cruiser damaged

The Battle of Coronel was a First World War naval battle that led to an Imperial German Navy victory over the Royal Navy on 1 November 1914, off the coast of central Chile near the city of Coronel. The East Asia Squadron (German: Ostasiengeschwader or Kreuzergeschwader) of the Imperial German Navy (Kaiserliche Marine) led by Vice-Admiral Graf Maximilian von Spee met and overpowered a British squadron commanded by Rear-Admiral Sir Christopher Cradock.

The engagement probably took place as a result of misunderstandings. Neither admiral expected to meet the other in full force. Once the two met, Cradock understood his orders were to fight to the end, despite the odds being heavily against him. Although Spee had an easy victory, destroying two enemy armoured cruisers for just three men injured, the engagement also cost him almost half his supply of ammunition, which was irreplaceable.

Shock at the British losses led the Admiralty to send more ships, including two modern battlecruisers, which in turn destroyed Spee and the majority of his squadron on 8 December at the Battle of the Falkland Islands.

== Background ==
At the outbreak of war the Royal Navy and the Royal Australian Navy, with assistance from New Zealand and Japanese naval and land forces in the Far East, had captured the German colonies of Kaiser-Wilhelmsland, Yap, Nauru, and Samoa, instead of searching for the German East Asia Squadron commanded by Vice-Admiral Maximilian von Spee, which had abandoned its base at the German concession at Tsingtao in the expectation of war breaking out with Japan. The East Asia Squadron rendezvoused at Pagan Island in the Marianas in early August 1914. Eventually, recognising the German squadron's potential for disrupting trade in the Pacific, the British Admiralty decided to destroy it and searched the western Pacific Ocean after the East Asia Squadron had conducted the Bombardment of Papeete (22 September 1914), where a French steamer reported its presence.

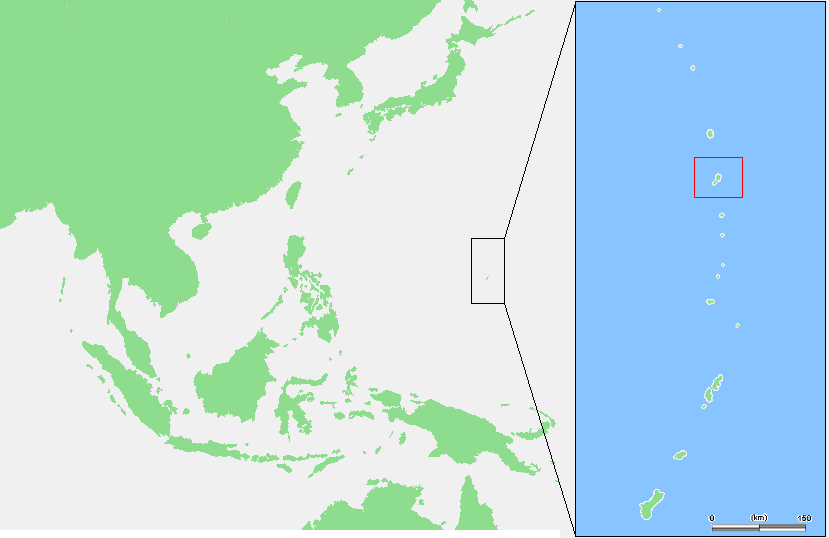
Pagan Island, Marianas Archipelago

On 4 October 1914, the British learned from an intercepted radio message that Spee planned to attack shipping on the trade routes along the west coast of South America. Having correctly guessed the intention of the German commander, Rear-Admiral Sir Christopher Cradock patrolled the area with a squadron consisting of the armoured cruisers HMS Good Hope (flagship) and HMS Monmouth, the modern light cruiser HMS Glasgow, and the armed merchantman HMS Otranto. The Admiralty had planned to reinforce the squadron by sending the newer and more powerful armoured cruiser HMS Defence from the Mediterranean, but temporarily diverted this ship to patrol the western Atlantic. Defence reached Montevideo two days after the battle, and Cradock instead received the pre-dreadnought battleship HMS Canopus.

The change of plan meant that the British squadron comprised obsolete or lightly armed vessels, crewed in the case of Good Hope by inexperienced naval reservists. Monmouth and Good Hope had a large number of 6-inch guns but only Good Hope was armed with two 9.2-inch guns mounted in single turrets. Spee had a superior force of five modern vessels (the armoured cruisers SMS Scharnhorst and Gneisenau and the light cruisers SMS Dresden, Leipzig and Nürnberg), led by officers hand-picked by Grand Admiral Alfred von Tirpitz. Scharnhorst and Gneisenau carried eight 8.2-inch guns each, which gave them an overwhelming advantage in range and firepower; the crews of both ships had earned accolades for their gunnery before the war. The Admiralty ordered Cradock to "be prepared to meet them in company", with no effort being made to clarify what action he was expected to take should he find Spee. On receiving his orders, Cradock asked the Admiralty for permission to split his fleet into two forces, each able to face Spee independently. The two groups would operate on the east and west coasts of South America to counter the possibility of Spee slipping past Cradock into the Atlantic Ocean. The Admiralty agreed and established the east coast squadron under Rear-Admiral Archibald Stoddart, consisting of three cruisers and two armed merchantmen.

The remaining vessels formed the west coast squadron, which was reinforced by Canopus on 18 October. At the outbreak of war and said to be in need of overhaul, Canopus had a top speed of 18 knots (33 km/h; 21 mph). (After the fleet sailed, it was found that the ship could only make 16 kn (30 km/h; 18 mph) and that the senior engineer was mentally ill.) The Admiralty agreed that with Canopus the fleet would be too slow to force an engagement with the German cruisers and that without Canopus the west coast squadron stood no chance. Cradock sailed from the Falklands on 20 October, still under the impression that Defence would soon arrive and with Admiralty orders to attack German merchant ships and to seek out the East Asiatic Squadron. As the British squadron rounded Cape Horn, wireless transmissions from Leipzig increased in power and it seemed that the British would catch the ship while isolated, but Spee had made rendezvous with Leipzig on 14 October and had enforced wireless silence on the other ships.

=== Lines of communication ===
On 30 October, before the battle but due to communications delays too late to have any effect, Admiral Jackie Fisher was re-appointed First Sea Lord, replacing Prince Louis of Battenberg, who, along with Churchill, had been preoccupied with fighting to keep his position as First Sea Lord in the face of widespread concern over the senior British Admiral being of German descent. Battenberg was a proven and reliable admiral but was replaced to appease public opinion. The crisis drew the attention of the most senior members of the Admiralty away from the events in South America: Churchill later claimed that if he had not been distracted, he would have questioned the intentions of his admiral at sea more deeply.

A signal from Cradock was received by Churchill on 27 October, advising the Admiralty of his intention to leave Canopus behind because of her slow speed and, as previously instructed, to take his remaining ships in search of Spee. He re-stated that he was still expecting reinforcements in the form of Defence, which he had previously been told was coming and that he had given orders for her to follow him as soon as possible. Although Defence had once been sent to reinforce Cradock, it had then been recalled part way, returned to the Mediterranean and then been sent again to form part of a new squadron patrolling the eastern coast of South America. A misunderstanding had arisen between Cradock and the Admiralty over how ships were to be assigned and used. Cradock believed he was expected to advance against Spee with those forces he had, whereas the Admiralty expected him to exercise caution, using Canopus for defence and merely to scout for the enemy or take advantage of any situation where he might come across part of the enemy force. Churchill replied to the signal, telling Cradock that Defence was to remain on the east coast and that Cradock was considered to have sufficient forces for his task, making no comment about his plan to abandon Canopus. Churchill had passed on the message to the Admiralty staff, saying he did not properly understand what Cradock intended.

Cradock probably received Churchill's reply on 1 November with the messages collected by Glasgow at Coronel, giving him time to read it before the battle. Thus, Cradock would have taken the message as final confirmation that he was doing what was expected. Departing from Stanley he had left behind a letter to be forwarded to Admiral of the Fleet Sir Hedworth Meux in the event of his death. In this, he commented that he did not intend to suffer the fate of Rear Admiral Ernest Troubridge, a friend of Cradock, who at the time was awaiting court-martial for failing to engage the enemy. The governor of the Falklands reported that Cradock had not expected to survive, as did the governor's aide. Luce reported that "Cradock was constitutionally incapable of refusing or even postponing action if there was the smallest chance of success".

On 3 November, Fisher in London received news from Valparaíso that Spee had been sighted. He urgently gave orders for Defence to join Cradock and stressed the need to keep Canopus together with the other ships. On 4 November, German reports of the battle started to reach London.

== Prelude ==
=== British preparations ===
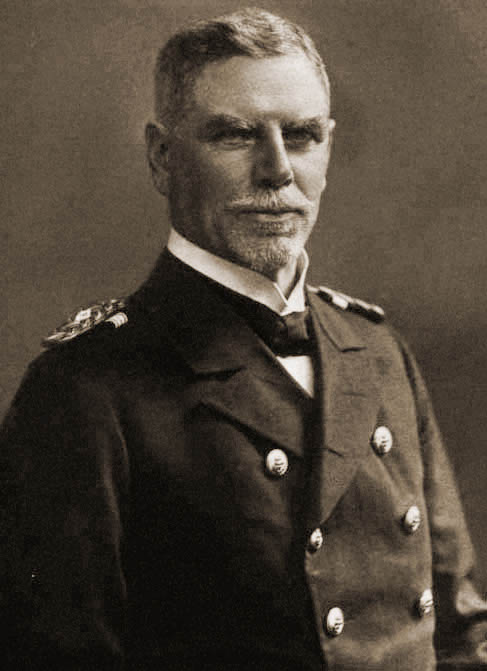
Vice-Admiral
Maximilian von Spee

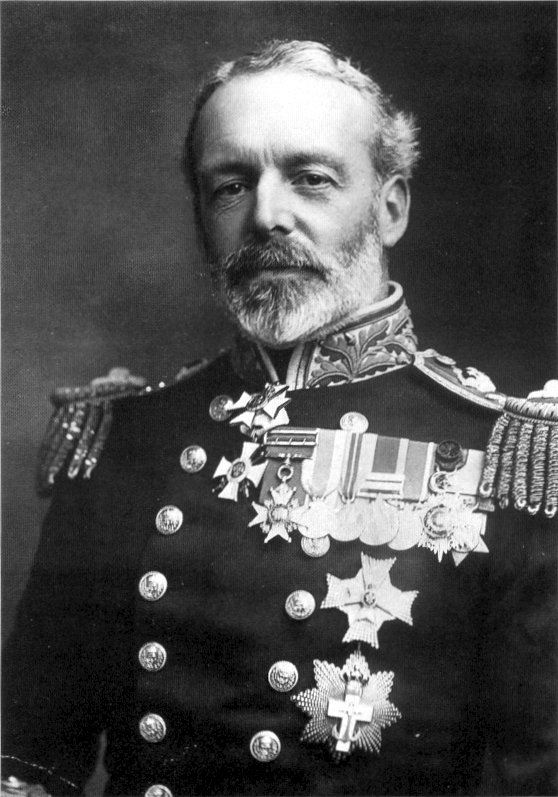
Rear-Admiral
Sir Christopher Cradock

On 22 October, Cradock cabled the Admiralty that he was going to round Cape Horn and was leaving Canopus behind to escort his colliers. Admiral John Fisher replaced Battenberg as First Sea Lord on 27 October, and the following day Fisher ordered Cradock not to engage Spee without Canopus. He then ordered HMS Defence to reinforce Cradock. The previous week Cradock had sent Glasgow to Coronel to pick up any messages the Admiralty might have sent. Spee, having learned of the presence of Glasgow off Coronel, sailed south from Valparaíso with all five warships with the intention of destroying her. Glasgow intercepted radio traffic from one of the German cruisers and informed Cradock, who turned his fleet north to intercept the cruiser.

Given the German superiority in speed, firepower, efficiency and numbers, why Cradock chose to engage puzzles historians. At the time Rear Admiral Ernest Troubridge, a friend of Cradock, was awaiting court-martial for failing to engage the enemy, and he had been told by the Admiralty that his force was "sufficient". The accepted view among Cradock's colleagues was that he was "constitutionally incapable of refusing action". On 31 October, he ordered his squadron to adopt an attacking formation. Both sides are thought to have expected to encounter a single ship until they sighted each other at 16:40 on 1 November.

== Battle ==
Ship movements during the Battle of Coronel. British ships are shown in red; German ships are shown in blue.

On 31 October, Glasgow entered Coronel harbour to collect messages and news from the British consul. Also in harbour was a supply ship—Göttingen—working for Spee, which immediately radioed with the news of the British ship entering harbour. Glasgow was listening to radio traffic, which suggested that German warships were close. Matters were confused because the German ships had been instructed to all use the same call sign, that of Leipzig. Spee decided to move his ships to Coronel to trap Glasgow while Admiral Cradock hurried north to catch Leipzig. Neither side realised the other's main force was nearby.

At 09:15 on 1 November, Glasgow left port to meet Cradock at noon, 40 mi (34.8 nmi; 64.4 km) west of Coronel. Seas were rough so that it was impossible to send a boat between the ships to deliver the messages, which had to be transferred on a line floated in the sea. At 13:05, the ships formed into a line abreast formation 15 mi (13.0 nmi; 24.1 km) apart, with Glasgow at the eastern end, and started to steam north at 10 knots (19 km/h; 12 mph) searching for Leipzig. At 16:17 Leipzig, accompanied by the other German ships, spotted smoke from the line of British ships. Spee ordered full speed so that Scharnhorst, Gneisenau and Leipzig were approaching the British at 20 knots (37 km/h; 23 mph), with the slower light cruisers Dresden and Nürnberg some way behind.

At 16:20, Glasgow and Otranto saw smoke to the north and then three ships at a range of 12 mi (10.4 nmi; 19.3 km). The British reversed direction, so that both fleets were moving south, and a chase began which lasted 90 minutes. Cradock was faced with a choice; he could either take his three cruisers capable of 20 kn (23 mph; 37 km/h), abandon Otranto and run from the Germans, or stay and fight with Otranto, which could only manage 16 kn (18 mph; 30 km/h). The German ships slowed at a range of 15,000 yd (13,720 m) to reorganise themselves for best positions, and to await best visibility, when the British to their west would be outlined against the setting sun.

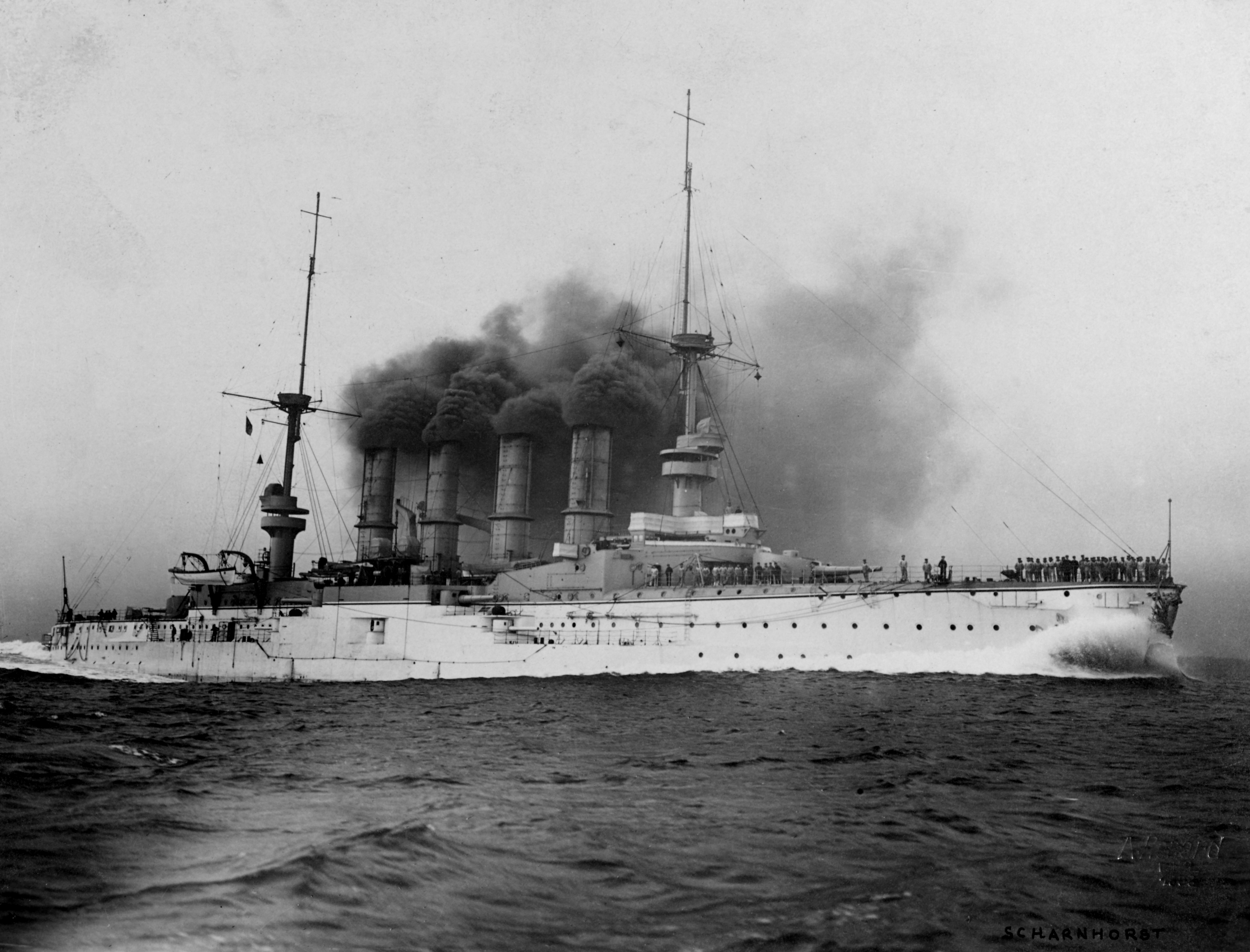
SMS Scharnhorst

At 17:10, Cradock decided he must fight, and drew his ships closer together. He changed course to south-east and attempted to close upon the German ships while the sun remained high. Spee declined to engage and turned his faster ships away, maintaining the distance between the forces which sailed roughly parallel at a distance of 14,000 yd (12,800 m). At 18:18, Cradock again attempted to close, steering directly towards the enemy, which once again turned away to a greater range of 18,000 yd (16,460 m). At 18:50, the sun set; Spee closed to 12,000 yd (10,970 m) and commenced firing.

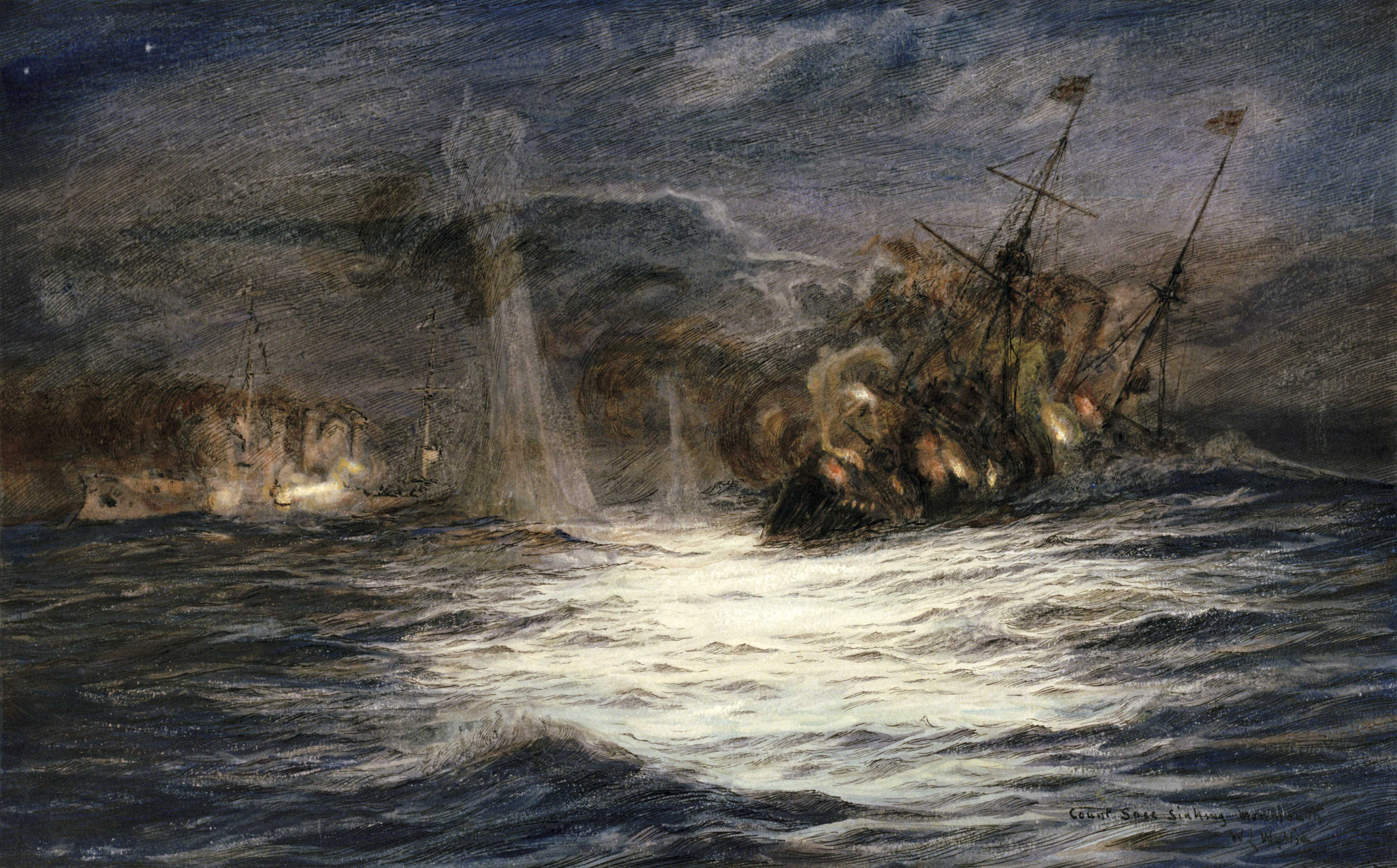
Count Spee sinking Monmouth by William Lionel Wyllie

The German ships had sixteen 21 cm (8 in) guns of comparable range to the two 9.2 in (234 mm) guns on Good Hope. One of these was hit within five minutes of the engagement's starting. Of the remaining 6 in (152 mm) guns on the British ships, most were in casemates along the sides of the ships, which continually flooded if the gun doors were opened to fire in heavy seas. The merchant cruiser Otranto—having only eight 4.7 in (120 mm) guns and being a much larger target than the other ships—retired west at full speed.

Since the British 6 in (152 mm) guns had insufficient range to match the German 21 cm (8 in) guns, Cradock attempted to close on the German ships. By 19:30, he had reached 6,000 yd (5,490 m) but as he closed, the German fire became correspondingly more accurate. Good Hope and Monmouth caught fire, presenting easy targets to the German gunners now that darkness had fallen, whereas the German ships had disappeared into the dark. Monmouth was first to be silenced. Good Hope continued firing, continuing to close on the German ships and receiving more and more fire. By 19:50, she had also ceased firing; subsequently her forward section exploded, then she broke apart and sank, with no one witness to the sinking.

Scharnhorst switched her fire to Monmouth, while Gneisenau joined Leipzig and Dresden which had been engaging Glasgow. The German light cruisers had only 10.5 cm (4 in) guns, which had left Glasgow almost unscathed, but these were now joined by the 21 cm (8 in) guns of Gneisenau. John Luce, captain of Glasgow, determined that nothing would be gained by staying and attempting to fight. It was noticed that each time he fired, the flash of his guns was used by the Germans to aim a new salvo, so he also ceased firing. One compartment of the ship was flooded but she could still manage 24 kn (28 mph; 44 km/h). He returned first to Monmouth, which was now dark but still afloat. Nothing was to be done for the ship, which was sinking slowly but would attempt to beach on the Chilean coast. Glasgow turned south and departed.

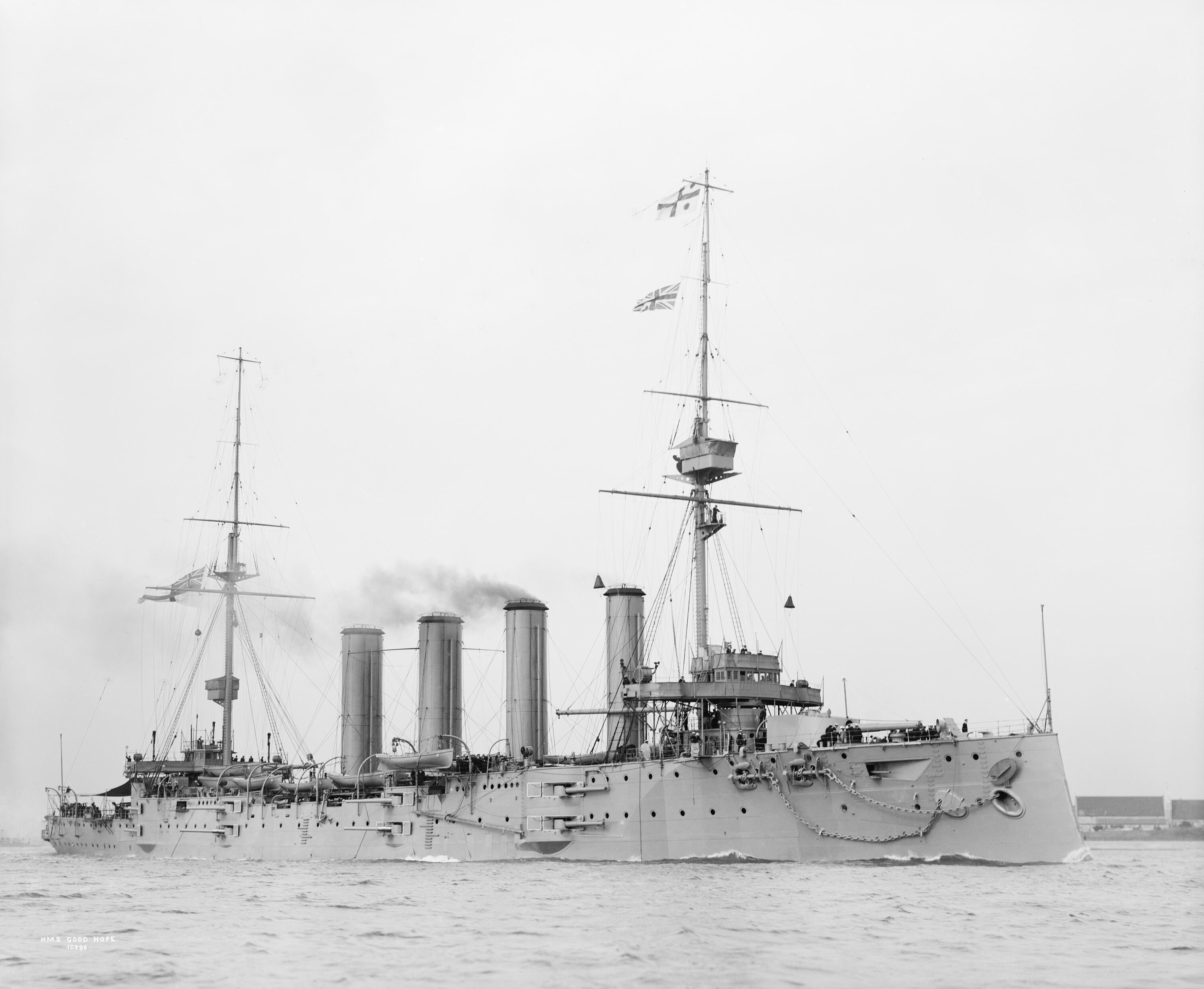
HMS Good Hope

There was some confusion amongst the German ships as to the fate of the two armoured cruisers, which had disappeared into the dark once they ceased firing, and a hunt began. Leipzig saw something burning, but on approaching found only wreckage. Nürnberg—slower than the other German ships—arrived late at the battle and sighted Monmouth, listing and badly damaged but still moving. After pointedly directing her searchlights at the ship's ensign, an invitation to surrender—which was declined—she opened fire, finally sinking the ship. Without firm information, Spee decided that Good Hope had escaped and called off the search at 22:15. Mindful of the reports that a British battleship was around somewhere, he turned north.

With no survivors from either Good Hope or Monmouth, 1,660 British officers and men were dead, including Admiral Cradock. Glasgow and Otranto both escaped (the former suffering five hits and five wounded men). Just two shells had struck Scharnhorst, neither of which exploded: one 6-inch shell hit above the armour belt and penetrated to a storeroom where, in Spee's words, "the creature just lay there as a kind of greeting." Another struck a funnel. In return, Scharnhorst had managed at least 35 hits on Good Hope, but at the expense of 422 21 cm (8 in) shells, leaving her with 350. Four shells had struck Gneisenau, one of which nearly flooded the officers' wardroom. A shell from Glasgow struck her aft turret and temporarily knocked it out. Three of Gneisenau's men were wounded; she expended 244 of her shells and had 528 left.

== Aftermath ==
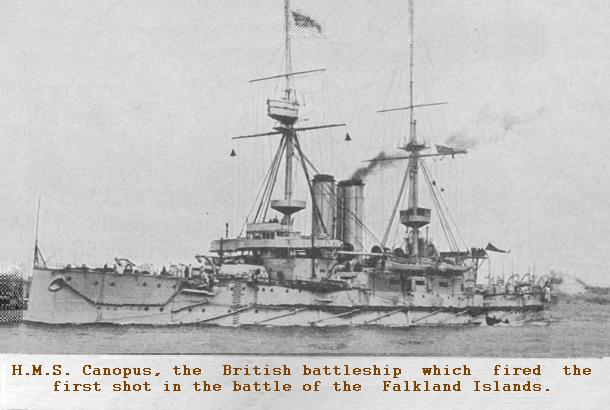
HMS Canopus; beached at Stanley; she was later re-floated and took part in the Gallipoli Campaign.

This was Britain's first naval defeat since the Battle of Plattsburgh in 1814 and the first destruction of a Royal Navy squadron since the Battle of Grand Port in 1810. Once news of the defeat reached the Admiralty, a new naval force was assembled under Vice-Admiral Doveton Sturdee, including the battlecruisers HMS Invincible and her sister-ship Inflexible. This found and destroyed Spee's force at the Battle of the Falkland Islands.

Glasgow, having escaped the battle, steamed south for three days at 20 kn (23 mph; 37 km/h), passing through the Straits of Magellan. Canopus—warned by Glasgow's messages—turned about and headed back at the best speed she could manage, 9 kn (10 mph; 17 km/h). On 6 November, the two ships met and proceeded slowly towards the Falklands. Twice during the voyage Canopus had to report that she was not under control. After coaling, both ships were ordered north but again Canopus broke down. She was finally ordered to be beached in the inner part of Stanley Harbour, where she could serve as a defensive battery.

Otranto steamed 200 nmi (370 km; 230 mi) out into the Pacific Ocean before turning south and rounding Cape Horn. On 4 November the Admiralty issued orders for the surviving ships to go to the Abrolhos Rocks, where a new force was being assembled. Rear-Admiral Archibald Stoddart, with the armoured cruisers HMS Carnarvon and Cornwall, were to meet them there and await the arrival of Defence. Sturdee was ordered to travel with the battlecruisers HMS Invincible and Inflexible—then attached to the Grand Fleet in the North Sea—to command a new squadron with clear superiority over Spee.

Despite his victory, Spee was pessimistic about his own chances of survival and dismissive with regard to the harm done to the British navy. The official explanation of the defeat as presented to the House of Commons by Winston Churchill was that Cradock: "feeling he could not bring the enemy immediately to action as long as he kept with Canopus, he decided to attack them with his fast ships alone, in the belief that even if he himself were destroyed... he would inflict damage on them which ...would lead to their certain subsequent destruction."

On 3 November Scharnhorst, Gneisenau and Nürnberg entered Valparaíso harbour to a welcome by the German population. Spee refused to join in the celebrations; when presented with a bouquet of flowers, he refused them, commenting that "these will do nicely for my grave". He was to die with most of the men on his ships on 8 December 1914, at the Battle of the Falkland Islands.

== Commemoration ==
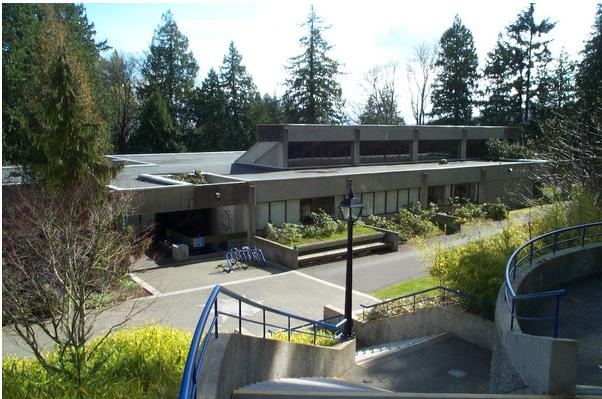
Coronel Memorial Library at Royal Roads University

The Coronel Memorial Library at Royal Roads Military College, now Royal Roads University in Victoria, British Columbia, Canada, was named in honour of the four Canadian midshipmen who perished in HMS Good Hope at the Battle of Coronel. In 1989 a memorial to those who perished in the battle was erected in the Plaza 21 de Mayo (21st May Square) at Coronel, Chile. Along with two plaques depicting HMS Good Hope and HMS Monmouth, it has a central dedication plaque (in Spanish) which reads

In memory of the 1,418 officers and sailors of the British military squadron and their Commander-in-Chief, Rear Admiral Sir Christopher Cradock, Royal Navy, who sacrificed their lives in the Naval Battle of Coronel, on 1 November 1914. The sea is their only grave.

— 21st May Square plaque
