= French gunboat Zélée =

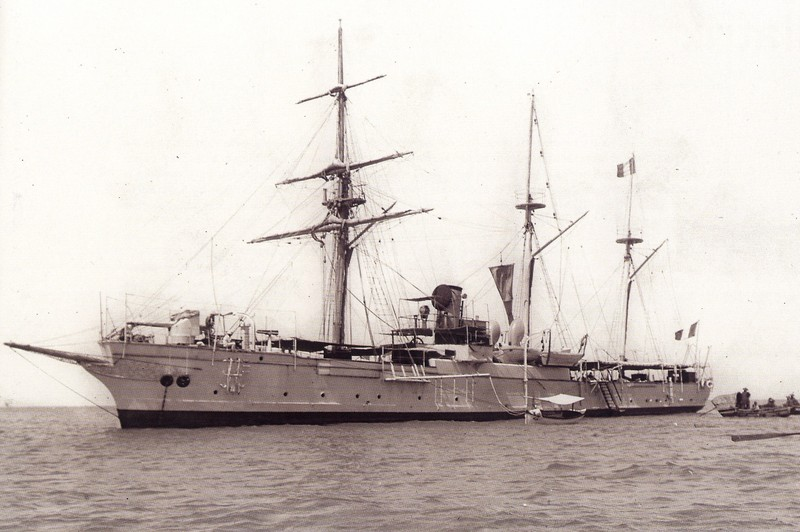

History

France
- Name: Zélée
- Launched: 1899
- Fate: Sunk during the Bombardment of Papeete, 22 September 1914

General characteristics
- Class & type: Surprise-class gunboat
- Displacement: 646 tons
- Length: 184 ft (56 m)
- Beam: 26 ft (7.9 m)
- Draught: 10.15 ft (3.09 m)
- Propulsion: 2 Niclausse boilers; Horizontal triple-expansion engine; 900 hp (671 kW)
- Speed: 13 knots (24 km/h; 15 mph)
- Armament: 2 × 3.94 in (100 mm) guns; 4 × 2.56 in (65 mm) guns; 4 × 37 mm (1 in) cannons
- Armour: Hardened steel-plated hull

Zélée was a Surprise-class gunboat of the French Navy. Designed for use overseas, she was used largely in the French colonies in Indochina and the Pacific. Assigned to patrol the waters off Tahiti at the start of World War I, she was sunk before scuttling could be completed during the Bombardment of Papeete on 22 September 1914.

== Service ==
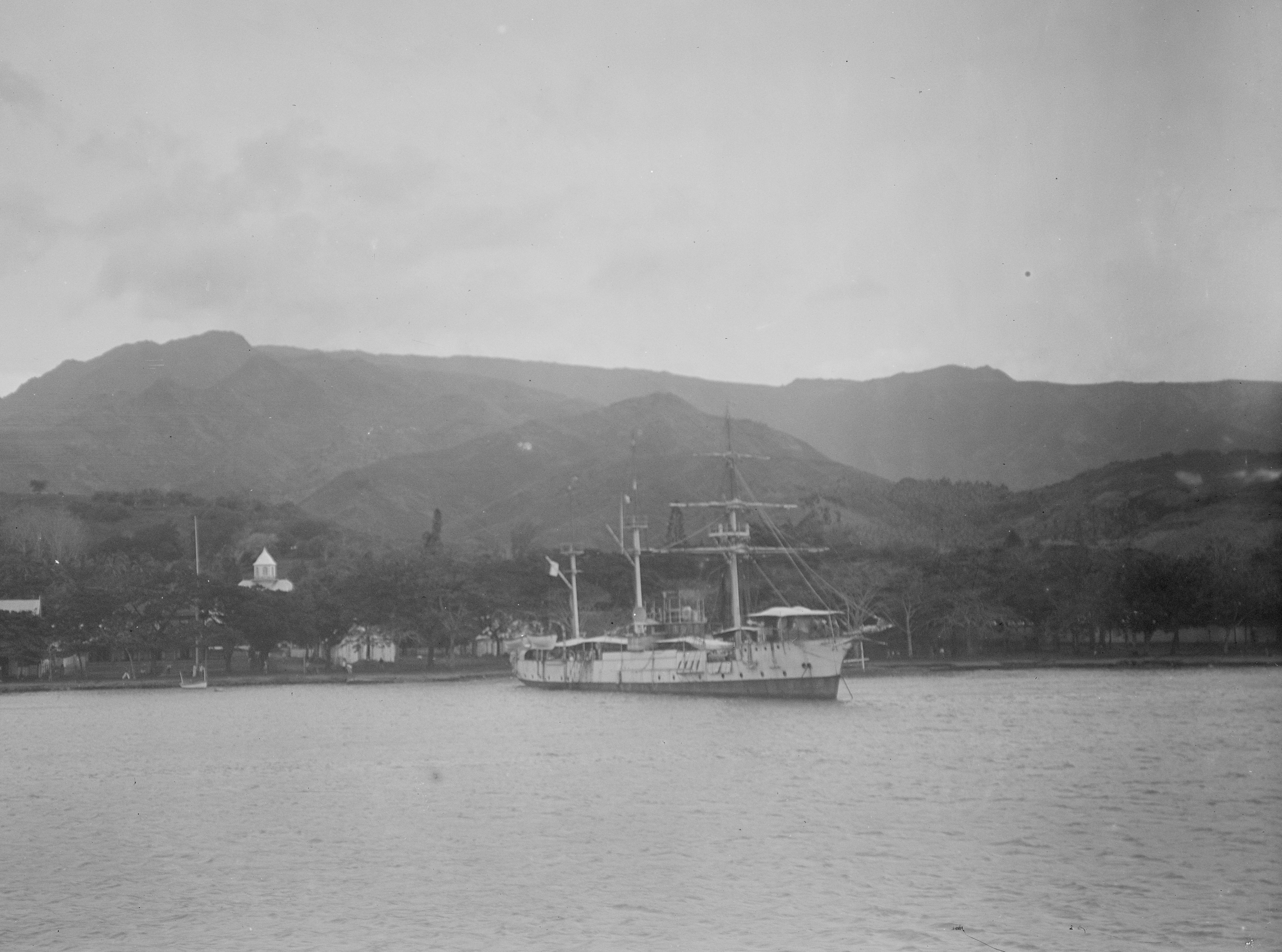
Zélée at Papeete in 1908

Present at Papeete during a devastating hurricane in February 1906, Zélée's commander was asked to assist with rescue efforts on the quarantine island of Motauta, but refused due to the high risk involved. Instead he lent the island's station master an open boat and left him with the task of finding men to man it.

At the outbreak of World War I, Zélée was stationed at Papeete and took part in the first French naval action of the war. The German cargo ship Walküre had been loading a cargo of phosphates at Makatea, an island 147 miles (237 km) from Tahiti. Zélée approached her, raised the French flag, and demanded her surrender. The German captain had not yet learned of the state of war between Germany and France and at first thought the entire situation was a joke and invited Zélée's commanding officer aboard for dinner; instead, Zélée took Walküre as a prize and brought her back to Tahiti.

On 22 September 1914, the Imperial German Navy armoured cruisers Scharnhorst and Gneisenau entered the port of Papeete. They sank Zélée and Walküre and bombarded the port. Zélée was raised, her guns removed and then scuttled as a blockship for the harbour on 29 September.
