= William Holmes (Australian general) =

Australian general (1863–1917)

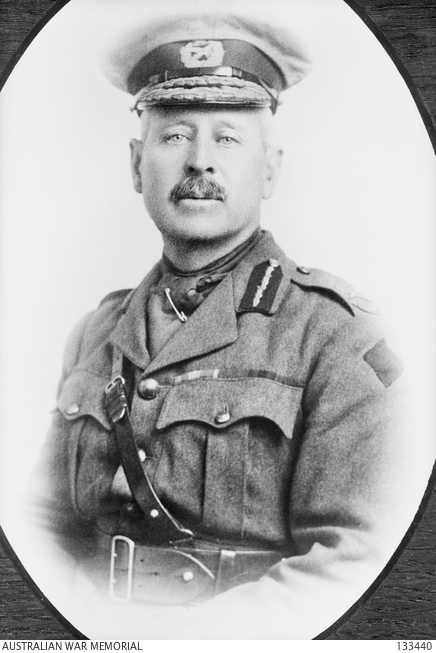
- Born: 12 September 1862; Sydney, New South Wales
- Died: 2 July 1917 (aged 54); Messines, Belgium
- Military career
- Allegiance: New South Wales (1872–01); Australia (1901–17)
- Branch: New South Wales Military Forces; Citizens Military Force
- Service years: 1872–1917
- Rank: Major General
- Commands: 4th Division (1917); 5th Brigade (1915–17); Australian Naval and Military Expeditionary Force (1914–15); 6th Infantry Brigade (1912–14); 1st Infantry Regiment (1902–11)
- Conflicts: Second Boer War; Battle of Diamond Hill; First World War; Battle of Bita Paka; Siege of Toma; Gallipoli Campaign; Battle of the Nek; Western Front; Battle of Pozières; Battle of Messines †
- Awards: Companion of the Order of St Michael and St George; Distinguished Service Order; Volunteer Officers' Decoration; Mentioned in Despatches (5)

Major General William Holmes CMG, DSO, VD (12 September 1862 – 2 July 1917) was a senior Australian Army officer during the First World War. He was mortally wounded by a German artillery shell while surveying the ground won at the Battle of Messines.

== Early life and career ==
Holmes was born in Sydney on 12 September 1862, the son of Captain William Holmes, the chief clerk at New South Wales Military Forces Headquarters, and Jane Holmes. Holmes lived in the Victoria Barracks and was educated at Paddington Public School.

In 1872 at the age of 10 Holmes joined the 1st Infantry Regiment of the New South Wales Military Forces as a bugler and served in every enlisted rank. Holmes worked at the Sydney Mint and then joined the Department of Works as a clerk on 24 June 1878. On 24 August 1887, he married Susan Ellen Green, whose family also lived in the Victoria Barracks. They had two children, one son and one daughter. On 20 April 1888 he became chief clerk and paymaster of the Metropolitan Board of Water Supply and Sewerage. Under his leadership, the department underwent a major expansion and the Cataract, Cordeaux and Avon dams were built.

Holmes served for 18 months in a submarine mining company before returning to the regiment and being commissioned as a second lieutenant in 1886. He was promoted to lieutenant in 1890, captain in 1894 and major in 1900.

== Boer War ==
In 1899, Holmes volunteered for service in South Africa. The company, initially commanded by Captain James Gordon Legge, left for South Africa in November 1899, with Holmes being promoted to lieutenant a month later, and on arrival was incorporated in the Australian Regiment. Originally an infantry unit, it became mounted in February. He saw action at Colesberg, Pretoria and Diamond Hill in June 1900, where he was wounded. Holmes was mentioned in despatches, promoted to brevet lieutenant colonel, and awarded the Distinguished Service Order (DSO). He returned home in August 1900.

Holmes commanded the 1st Australian Infantry from 1902 to 1911. He was promoted to colonel on 6 January 1912 and was appointed to command the 6th Infantry Brigade.

== First World War ==
During the First World War, Holmes served first as Commander of the Australian Naval and Military Expeditionary Force (AN&MEF), and later as Commander of the 5th Brigade, which he took to Gallipoli and the Western Front.

=== German New Guinea ===
Shortly after war broke out, a special expeditionary force, the AN&MEF, was formed to occupy German possessions in New Guinea and the Pacific Islands. Holmes was appointed the commander. Under Holmes command the force sailed from Sydney on the auxiliary cruiser HMAS Berrima on 19 August 1914. The German governor surrendered to Holmes on 12 September 1914 and the British flag was raised over the town.

Holmes was criticised in Australia for offering extremely lenient terms, but he was under orders to occupy, not annex, German New Guinea. Holmes became administrator of New Guinea. He relinquished the post to Colonel Samuel Pethebridge in January 1915 and returned to Australia, where his appointment to the AN&MEF was terminated on 6 February 1915.

=== Gallipoli ===
On 16 March 1915, Holmes was appointed to the Australian Imperial Force as commander of the newly formed 5th Brigade with the rank of colonel. The brigade left Sydney in May and arrived in Egypt in June 1915, where it became part of the 2nd Division.

The 5th Brigade began moving to Gallipoli in early August and Holmes arrived on the 19th. The brigade was placed at the disposal of Major General Alexander Godley of the New Zealand and Australian Division and elements participated in the fighting for Hill 60. The 5th Brigade took over the trenches facing the Nek from the 3rd Light Horse Brigade on 28 August 1915. Holmes, promoted to temporary brigadier general, dated 21 August, made a habit of regularly visiting every key part of his front lines. When Major General James Legge fell ill in November and was evacuated, Holmes took over acting command of the 2nd Division. He was still in temporary command of the division in December 1915, when they were amongst the last of the Anzac troops to be evacuated from Gallipoli.

=== Western Front ===
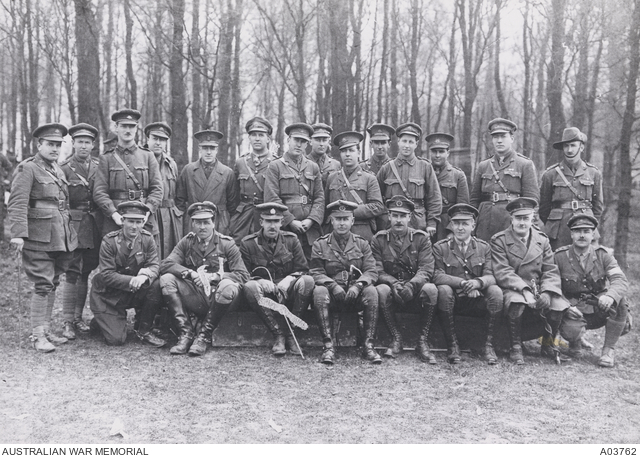
Informal portrait of officers who attended the 12th Australian Infantry Brigade Sports Meeting at Henencourt Wood, France, April 1917. Sat in the centre of the front row is the GOC 4th Australian Division, Major General W. Holmes.

After the evacuation of Anzac, Holmes returned to the 5th Brigade, which he took to the Western Front in April 1916. He led the brigade in the attacks on the Pozières Heights in August and at Flers in October 1916. In January 1917, Holmes was given command of the 4th Division, replacing Major General Vaughan Cox.

Holmes continued his habit of personally reconnoitring every part of his line. On 31 March 1917, he paid a daylight visit to an outpost near Lagnicourt, as usual wearing his red hat band, accompanied by his aide, Lieutenant Fergusson. Holmes was sniped at but not hit; Fergusson was hit and had to be left behind, to be evacuated after nightfall. Shortly afterwards the post was shelled, causing heavy casualties to the garrison, including Fergusson who was injured for a second time.

Holmes commanded his division at Bullecourt in April, where he opposed the operation that ultimately caused his division very heavy losses, and at Messines in June. On 2 July 1917, Holmes took the Premier of New South Wales, William Holman, to survey the Messines battlefield. The party left his car in order to avoid a dangerous corner, something Holmes usually would not do. As they set out on foot, a German shell, believed to be a seventy-seven, or a "pip-squeak" landed nearby and Holmes was hit through the chest and lung. His aide, Captain Maxwell, along with Frank Edwards the private secretary to Holman, took Holmes to the nearest aid post, where he died. He was buried at Trois Arbres Cemetery, Steenwerck, France. Holmes was the most senior Australian officer killed in action on the Western Front.

A memorial service was held for him in October 1917 at St Matthias' Anglican Church, Paddington, the church where he and Susan were married.

== Memorial ==
William Holmes Street in the Potts Hill Business Park, Potts Hill New South Wales is named after Major General William Holmes. Potts Hill Business Park is on the edge of the Potts Hill reservoir, a major water storage operated by Sydney Water. General Holmes Drive that runs between Botany Bay and Sydney Airport is named after him. Holmes Avenue, Clontarf, New South Wales, is also named after him.

== See also ==
- List of Australian diarists of World War I
- List of Australian generals
- List of generals of the British Empire who died during the First World War

Government offices
| Preceded by Eduard Haber as Governor of German New Guinea | Administrator of New Guinea; 1914–1915 | Succeeded by Colonel Samuel Augustus Pethebridge |
