= Australian Naval and Military Expeditionary Force =

Australian Army and naval expeditionary force during World War I

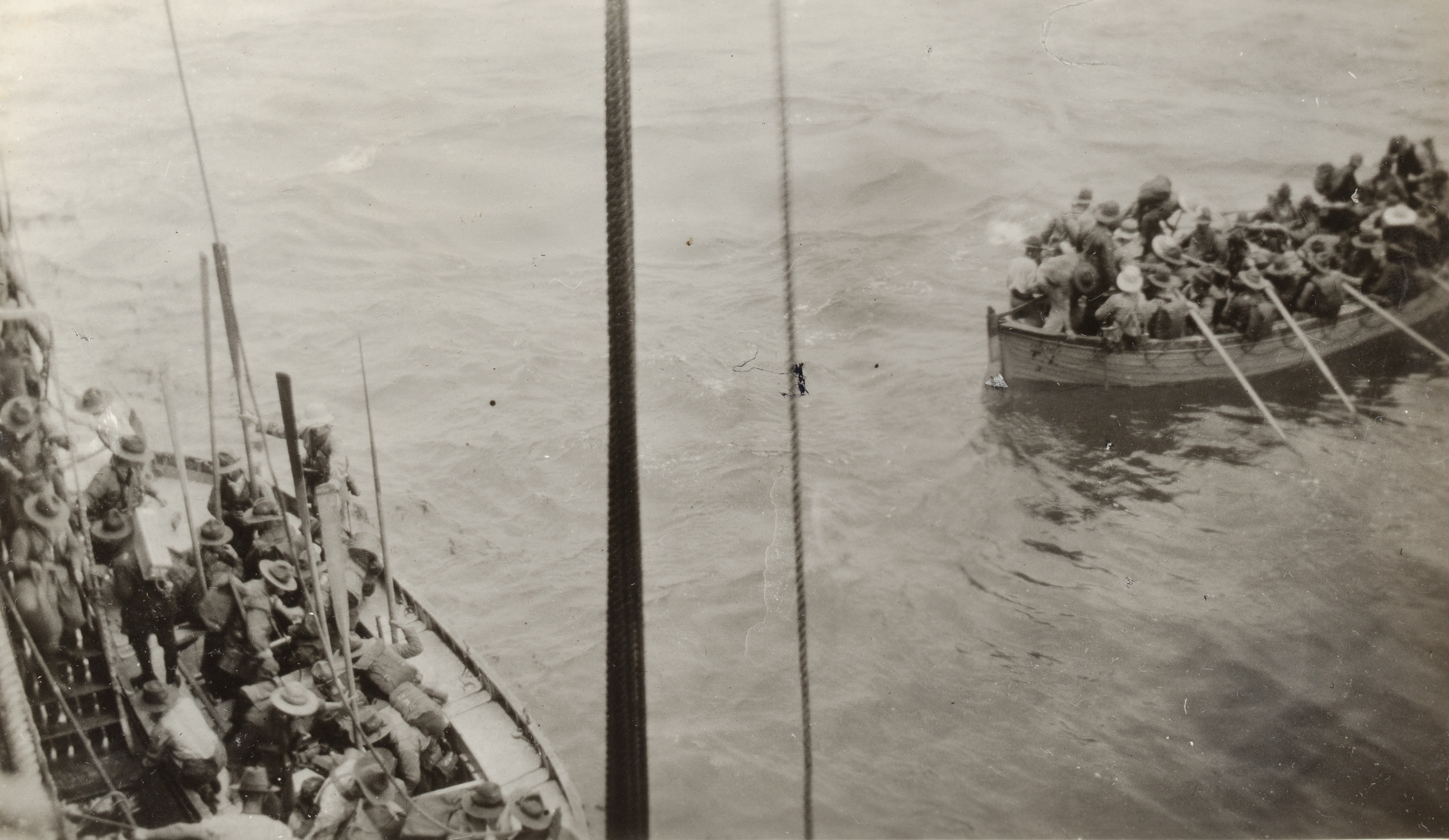
- Troops landing at Herbertshöhe (Kokopo), by F. S. Burnell, September 1914.
- Active: 1914
- Country: Australia
- Allegiance: Britain
- Branch: Australian Army
- Type: Infantry
- Size: 2,000 men
- Engagements: World War I: Battle of Bita Paka; Siege of Toma

Commanders
- Commander: Colonel William Holmes

The Australian Naval and Military Expeditionary Force (AN&MEF) was a small volunteer force of approximately 2,000 men, raised in Australia shortly after the outbreak of World War I to seize and destroy German wireless stations in German New Guinea in the south-west Pacific. The German wireless installations were ordered to be destroyed because they were used by Vizeadmiral (Vice Admiral) Maximilian von Spee's East Asia Squadron of the Imperial German Navy, which threatened merchant shipping in the region. Following the capture of German possessions in the region, the AN&MEF provided occupation forces for the duration of the war. New Zealand provided a similar force for the occupation of German Samoa.

== History ==
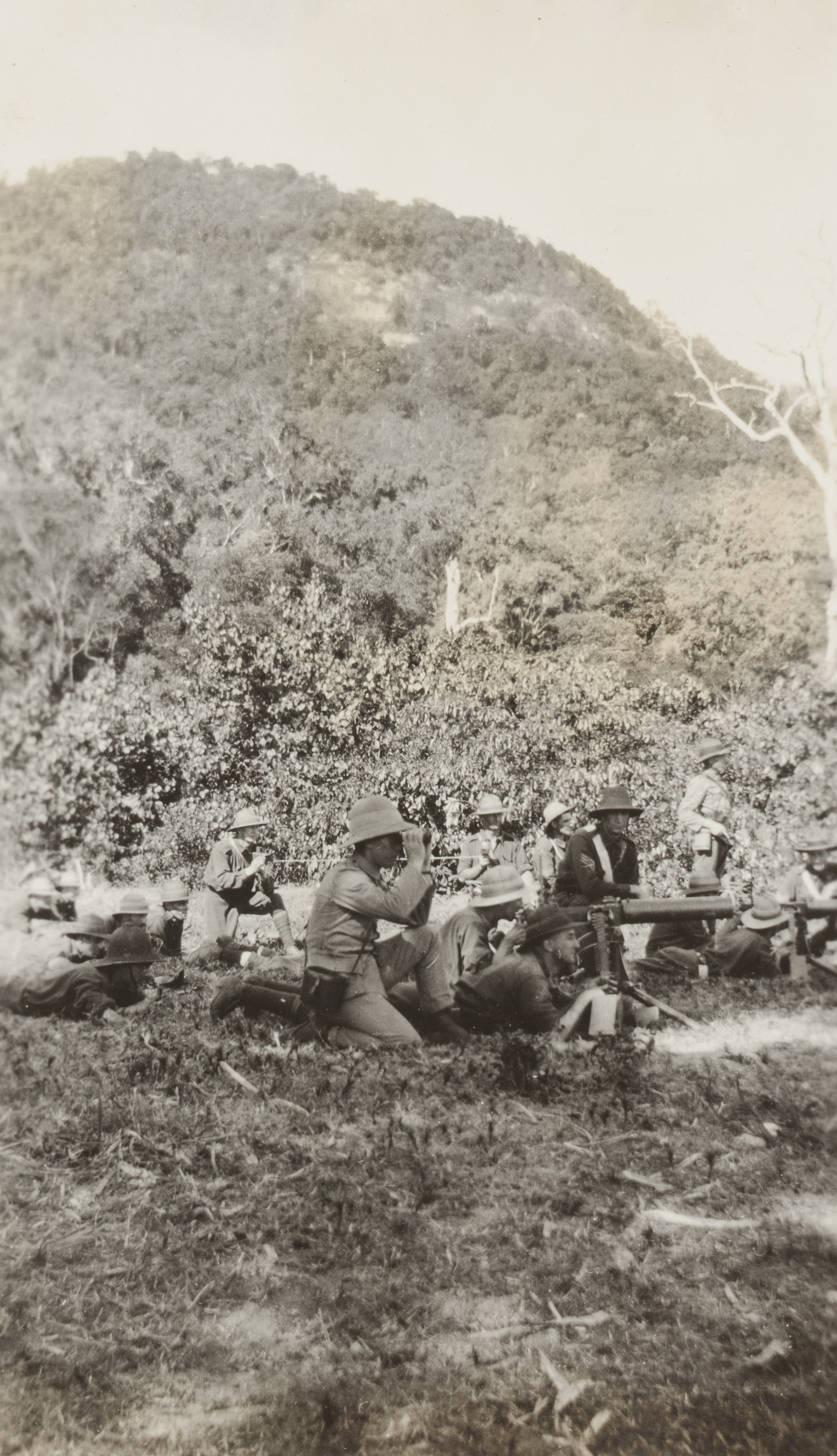
Australian Machine Gun Section training, Palm Island, F. S. Burnell State Library of New South Wales, PXA 2165

=== Formation ===
The Australian Naval and Military Expeditionary Force (AN&MEF) began forming following a request by the British government on 6 August 1914. The objectives of the force were the German stations at Yap in the Caroline Islands, Nauru and at Rabaul, New Britain. The force was assembled under the guidance of Colonel James Legge, and was separate from the Australian Imperial Force (AIF) forming under Major General William Bridges. The AN&MEF comprised one battalion of infantry of 1,000 men enlisted in Sydney, plus 500 naval reservists and ex-sailors who would serve as infantry. The 1st Battalion, AN&MEF was commanded by Lieutenant Colonel Russell Watson, while the naval reservists were formed into six companies under Commander Joseph Beresford. Also included were two machine gun sections, a signals section and a medical detachment. Another battalion of militia from the Queensland-based Kennedy Regiment, which had been hurriedly dispatched to garrison Thursday Island, also contributed 500 volunteers to the force. Recruitment began on 11 August, with the very few of the infantry having had previous military experience.

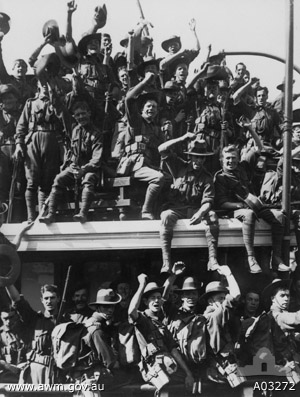
Embarkation of the Australian Naval and Military Expeditionary Force in Sydney

Under the overall command of Colonel William Holmes, the AN&MEF departed Sydney on 19 August aboard HMAS Berrima and halted at Palm Island off Townsville until the New Zealand force, escorted by the battlecruiser HMAS Australia, cruiser HMAS Melbourne, and the French cruiser Montcalm, occupied Samoa on 30 August. The AN&MEF then moved to Port Moresby where it met the Queensland contingent aboard the transport TSS Kanowna. The force then sailed for German New Guinea on 7 September but the Kanowna was left behind when her stokers refused to work. (Note: The Kennedy Regiment had been under orders that in the event of war they were to reinforce the garrison on Thursday Island to prevent German military action there. Thus on the outbreak of the war, the regiment's officers had hastily mobilised it and requisitioned Kanowa under the Defence Act. Once they had arrived on the island, a call for volunteers for overseas service had been made and 500 men had responded. As such it was decided to retain the Kanowa to transport this force wherever it needed to go. The crew of the ship had not been consulted about whether or not they wished to participate in possible military action and as a result there was considerable discontentment amongst the crew on board. The force finally sailed on 7 September 1914, but shortly after leaving Port Moresby, Kanowa dropped out of the convoy when the stokers on board refused to work, stopping the ship dead in the water.) The soldiers from the Kennedy Regiment were also left in Port Moresby as Holmes felt that they were not trained or equipped well enough to be committed to the fighting that was expected.

=== Landing at Rabaul ===
Off the eastern tip of New Guinea, the Berrima rendezvoused with Australia and the light cruiser HMAS Sydney plus some destroyers. Melbourne had been detached to destroy the wireless station on Nauru. The task force reached Rabaul on 11 September, finding the port free of German forces. Sydney and the destroyer HMAS Warrego landed small parties of naval reservists at the settlements of Kabakaul and the German gubernatorial capital Herbertshöhe (now Kokopo) on Neu-Pommern (now New Britain), south-east of Rabaul. These parties were reinforced firstly by sailors from Warrego and later by infantry from Berrima. A small 25-man force of naval reservists was subsequently landed at Kabakaul Bay and proceeded inland to capture the radio station believed to be in operation at Bita Paka, 7 kilometres (4.3 mi) to the south.

The Australians were resisted by a mixed force of German reservists and Melanesian native police, who forced them to fight their way to the objective. By nightfall the radio station was reached, and it was found to have been abandoned. The mast had been dropped but its instruments and machinery were still intact. During the fighting at Bita Paka seven Australians were killed and five wounded, while the defenders lost one German NCO and about 30 Melanesians killed, and one German and 10 Melanesians wounded. Later it was alleged that the heavy losses among the Melanesian troops was the result of the Australians bayoneting all those they had captured during the fighting. As a result of this engagement Seaman W.G.V. Williams became the first Australian fatality of the war.

At nightfall on 12 September, Berrima landed the AN&MEF infantry battalion at Rabaul. The following afternoon, despite the fact that the German governor had not surrendered the territory, a ceremony was carried out to signal the British occupation of New Britain. The German administration had withdrawn inland to Toma and at dawn on 14 September, HMAS Encounter bombarded a ridge near the town, while half a battalion advanced towards the town, supported by a field gun.

=== German surrender ===
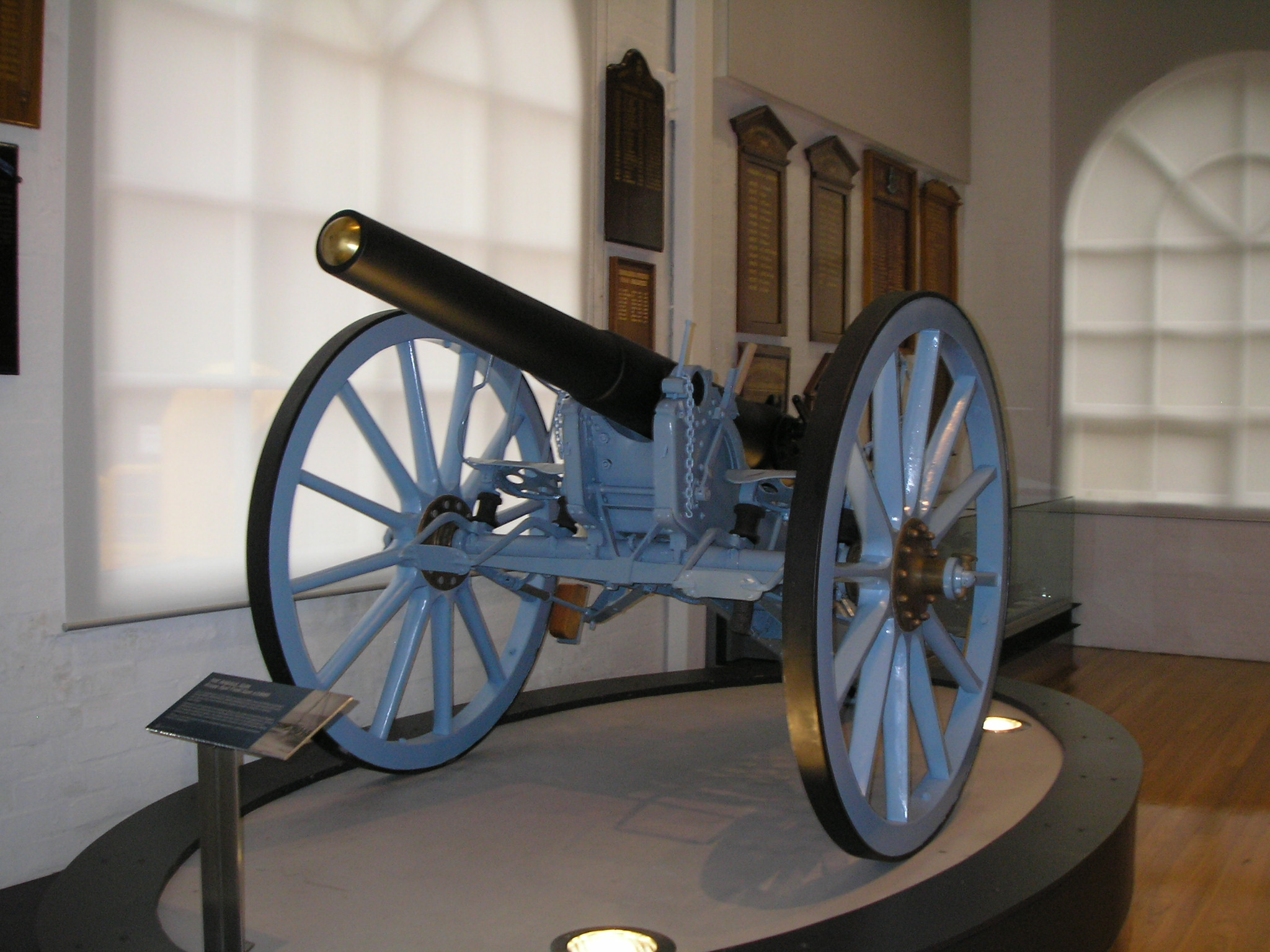
A German 7.7 cm FK 96 artillery piece captured at Rabaul, displayed at the Royal Australian Navy Heritage Centre, Sydney

The show of Australian firepower was sufficient to start negotiations, ending the Siege of Toma. Terms were signed on 17 September and all military resistance ceased, with the remaining 40 German soldiers and 110 natives surrendering on 21 September. The German colony at Madang on Kaiser-Wilhelmsland (the New Guinea mainland) was occupied on 24 September but the German auxiliary cruiser SMS Cormoran, which was lurking nearby, escaped undetected. Over the next two months the remaining outposts were occupied. The terms of the surrender allowed the colony's governor, Dr Eduard Haber, to return to Germany while German civilians were allowed to remain as long as they swore an oath of neutrality. Those who refused were transported to Australia from where they could freely travel back to Germany.

Although successful, the operation was not well managed, and the Australians had been effectively delayed by a half-trained force. Regardless, the Australians had prevailed not least of all because of their unexpected ability to fight close terrain, while the outflanking of the German positions had unnerved their opponents. The losses of the AN&MEF were light in the context of later operations but were sufficiently heavy given the relatively modest gain. These losses were further compounded by the disappearance of the Australian submarine HMAS AE1 during a patrol off Rabaul on 14 September, with 35 men aboard.

=== Occupation ===
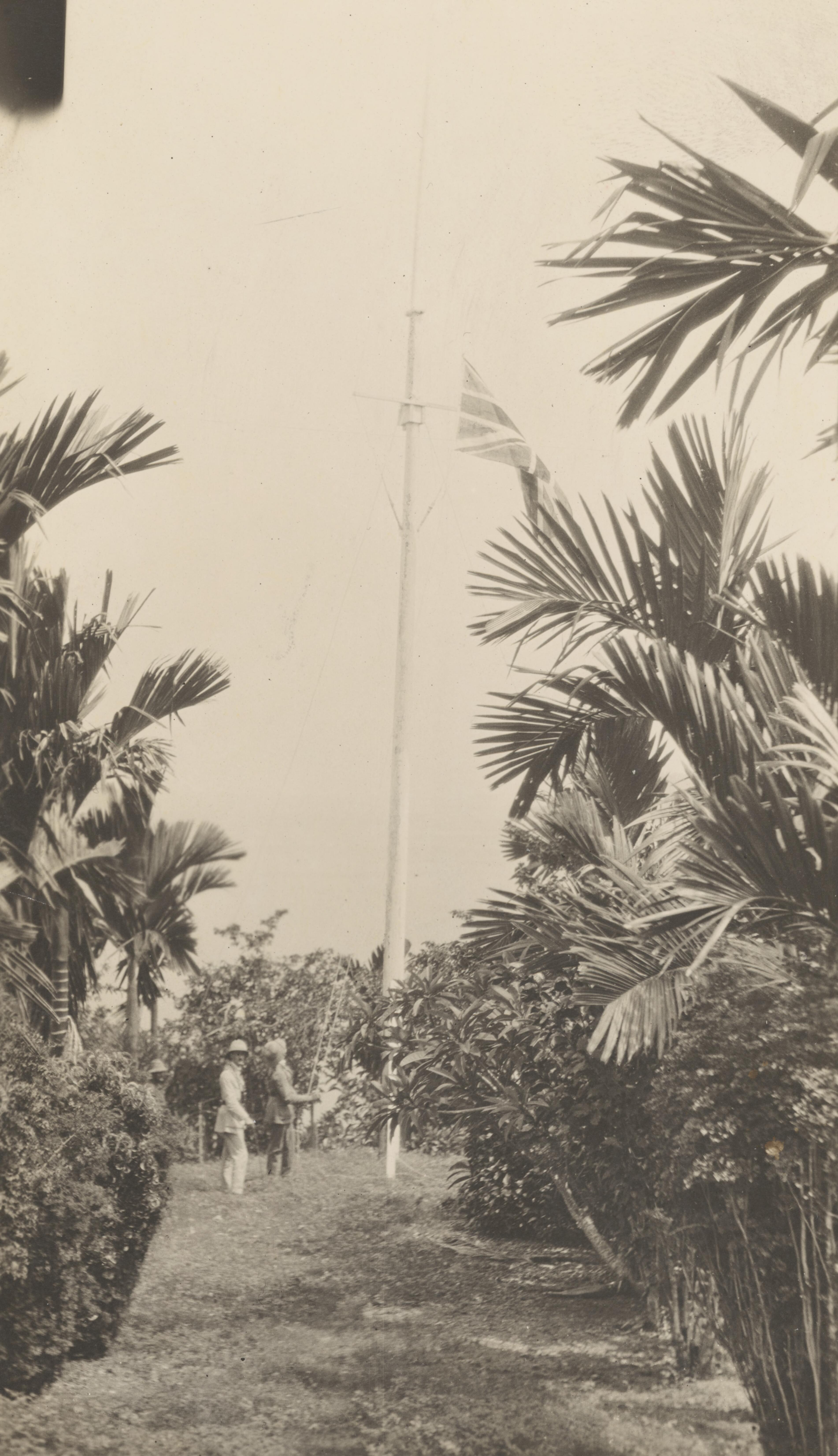
Australian soldiers hoisting the Union Jack at Kieta on Bougainville Island

Following the capture of German possessions in the region, the AN&MEF provided occupation forces for the duration of the war. The occupation force included Australian nurses, who also later were part of the "Tropical Force". A military government was subsequently set up by Holmes. On 9 January 1915, Holmes handed over command of the AN&MEF to Brigadier General Sir Samuel Pethebridge, the former Secretary of the Department of Defence. Holmes returned to Australia in early 1915 and re-enlisted in the AIF, as did most of his men. Many later served in Egypt, Gallipoli, Sinai and Palestine and on the Western Front. A large number became casualties, including Holmes, who was killed in action in 1917. They were replaced by the 3rd Battalion, AN&MEF, which was known as the Tropical Force because it had been specially enlisted for service in the tropics. The size of the garrison at this time was set at a total of 600 men.

Following the end of hostilities in November 1918 the role of the AN&MEF in the former German colonies in New Guinea had become primarily one of civil administration, although it continued to provide a garrison for the next two and a half years. The military government continued until 1921 when Australia received a mandate from the League of Nations to govern the territory and a new civilian administration was constituted under the New Guinea Act 1920. Although the AN&MEF had seen no further action following the initial seizure of the colony, in the years that followed the climate and a range of tropical diseases, such as malaria, had resulted in dozens of fatalities before the deployment concluded. A total of 3,011 men served in the AN&MEF. Although interrupted by Japanese occupation between 1942–45, Australian administration lasted until 1975 when Papua New Guinea gained its independence.

== Gallery ==
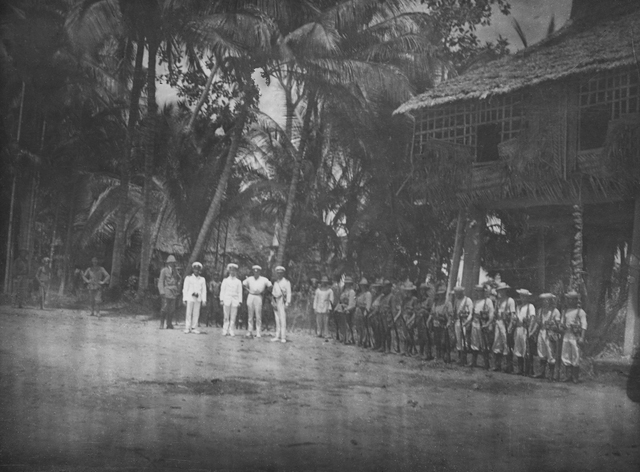
The raising of the Australian flag on 16 December 1914 in Angoram, New Guinea.

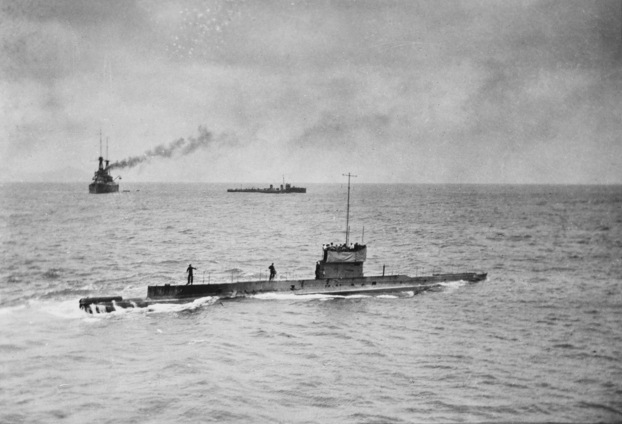
The submarine AE1 with other Australian ships off Rossel Island on 9 September 1914. On 14 September it disappeared during a patrol off Rabaul.

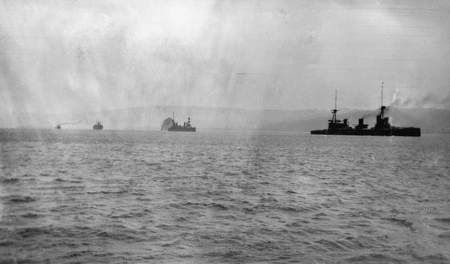
The fleet, headed by the flagship Australia, entering Rabaul's Simpson Harbour on 12 September 1914.
