= Joseph Arthur Hamilton Beresford =

Senior officer in the Royal Australian Navy

Joseph Beresford
- Born: 11 August 1861; Laugharne, Wales
- Died: 28 December 1952 (aged 91); Hobart, Australia
- Military career
- Allegiance: United Kingdom; Australia
- Branch: Royal Navy; Royal Australian Navy
- Rank: Commander
- Conflicts: First World War; Battle of Bita Paka
- Awards: Mentioned in Despatches

Commander Joseph Arthur Hamilton Beresford (11 August 1861 – 28 December 1952) was a senior officer in the Royal Australian Navy. Born in Laugharne, Wales, Beresford came to Australia in 1900 on loan from the British Royal Navy. During the early stages of the First World War he commanded the naval brigade attached to the Australian Naval and Military Expeditionary Force (AN&MEF) which captured German New Guinea in September 1914. He was later mentioned in despatches. His only son, Arthur, was killed during the war serving with the 26th Battalion. Beresford later settled in Sydney where he lived until the death of his wife in 1951. He died at the age of 91 in Hobart, Tasmania. He was survived by a grandson and a granddaughter.
