= Banknotes of New Guinea =

Banknotes were issued in New Guinea in late 1914 after Australian forces took over German New Guinea.

These extremely rare notes are denominated in New Guinean marks, as opposed to German New Guinean marks. The New Guinean mark was created as a way of driving the German New Guinean mark out of circulation, and to function as a temporary currency until the Australian pound was introduced.

The notes are inscribed 'TREASURY NOTE', '(x) MARKS', 'Payable in coin at the Treasury, Rabaul. Dated at Rabaul this ...day of...191...', 'For and on behalf of the Treasury'. The denomination is also expressed in figures in two boxes at the top of the notes.

The notes are extremely rare. They are listed in the Standard Catalog of World Paper Money quite wrongly under 'German New Guinea'. Only 29 notes are known to have survived, although reprints of all have been made. . The 100 mark note may be unique.

A primitive 20 Mark note printed with boot polish is also reputed to have existed which was used for paying the wages of the German Voluntary Brigade.

== Catalogue ==
- P1a. 5 Marks. 14 October 1914.
- P1b. 5 Marks. 1 January 1915. Pen cancelled.
- P2a. 10 Marks. 14 October 1914.
- P2b. 10 Marks. 1 January 1915. Pen cancelled.
- P3a. 20 Marks. 1914.
- P3b. 20 Marks. 1 January 1915. Pen cancelled.
- P4a. 50 Marks. 16 October 1914.
- P4b. 50 Marks. 1 January 1915. Pen cancelled.
- P5. 100 Marks. 5 November 1914.
