= Bita Paka =

Village in Papua New Guinea

Coordinates: 4°24′15″S 152°18′07″E

Bita Paka is a village in Bitapaka Rural LLG of East New Britain Province, Papua New Guinea. The site was the location of a former wireless station used by the German Empire, during World War I. The Battle of Bita Paka occurred on 11 September 1914, between Australian and German Empire troops, where the wireless station was captured by the Australians. Rabaul (Bita Paka) War Cemetery is nearby.
