= Bitapaka Rural LLG =

Local-level government in Papua New Guinea

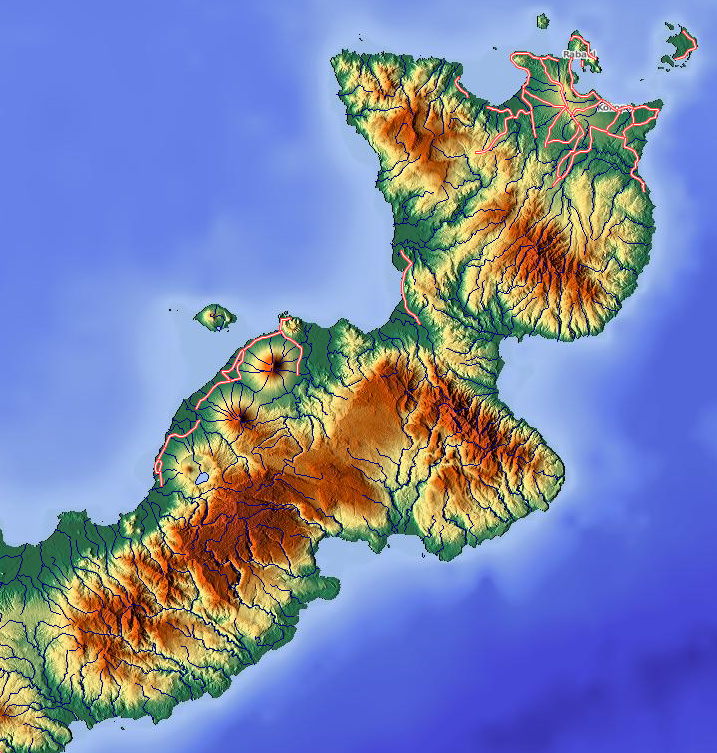
- Location within Papua New Guinea
- Coordinates: 4.404088°S 152.301973°E
- Country: Papua New Guinea
- Province: East New Britain Province
- Time zone: UTC+10 (AEST)

Bitapaka Rural LLG is a local-level government (LLG) of East New Britain Province, Papua New Guinea.

== Wards ==
1. Tavui No 1
2. Tavui No 2
3. Balada
4. Ratavul
5. Ralubang
6. Togoro
7. Tabuna
8. Katakatai
9. Vunabaur
10. Watwat
11. Londip
12. Ganai
13. Marmar
14. Menebonbon
15. Bilur
16. Korai
17. Kamakamar
18. Birar
19. Makurapau
20. Rainau
21. Malakuna
22. Ulaveo

== See also ==
- Bita Paka
