= New Guinean mark =

Currency of colonial New Guinea

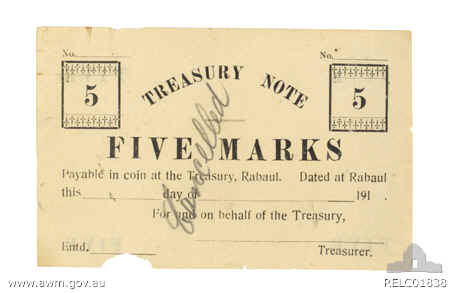
Α 5 mark treasury note issued by Australian authorities

The Mark (German plural: Mark, English plural: marks) was the currency of the colony of German New Guinea between 1884 and 1911. It was equal to the German Mark, which was also legal tender in the colony.

Initially, only German currency circulated. This was supplemented in 1894 by coins issued specifically for New Guinea. These coins were demonetized on 15 April 1911, in exchange for the German Mark, the only legal tender after that date.

In 1914, during World War I, German New Guinea was quickly occupied by Australia. That year, the Australian authorities issued Treasury notes denominated in marks. In 1915, the Mark was replaced by the Australian pound.

== Coins ==
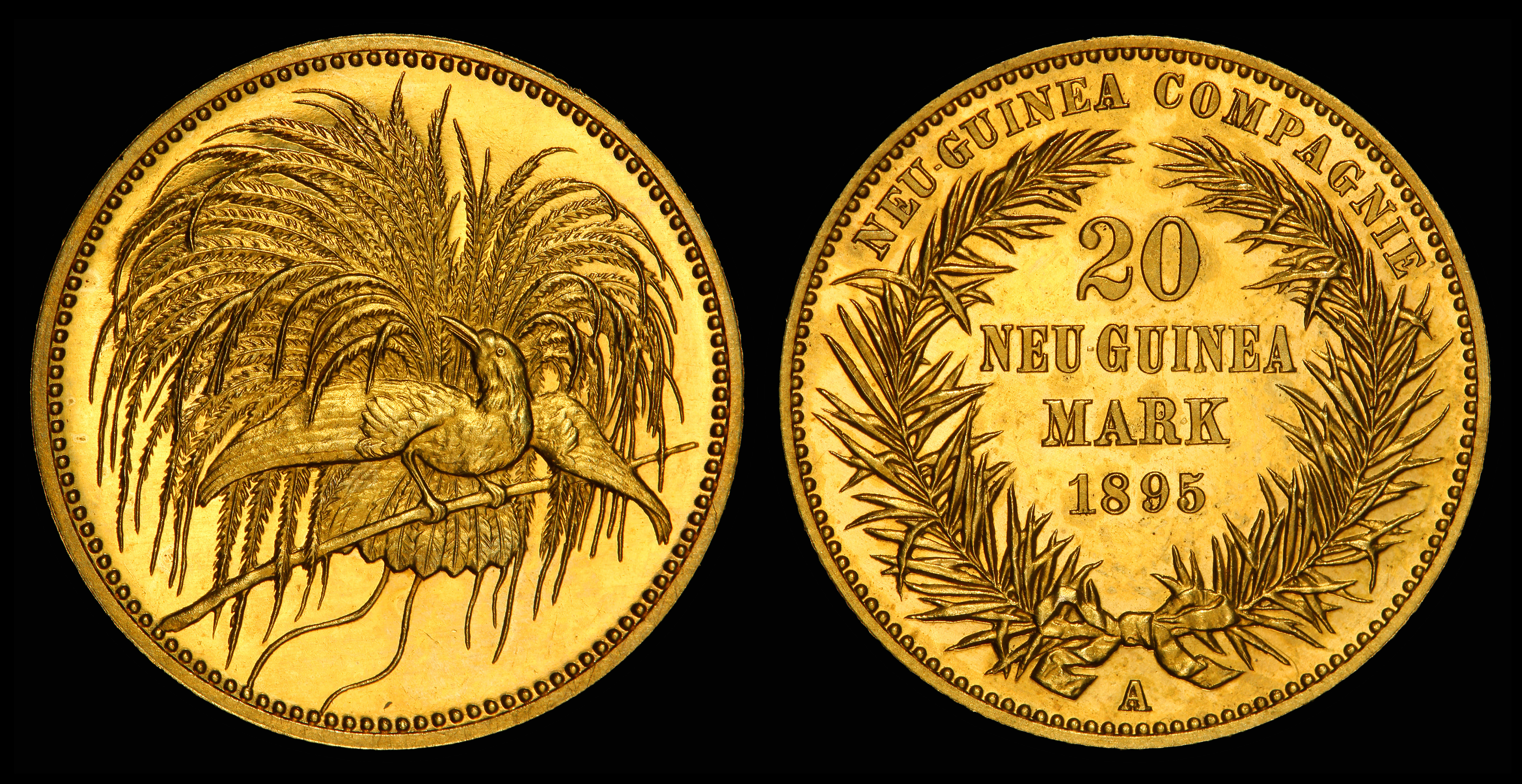
1895 20 Mark gold coin issued by the German New Guinea Company.

In 1894, the Neu-Guinea Companie issued bronze 1, 2 and 10 Pfennig and silver ½, 1, 2 and 5 Mark coins, followed by gold 10 and 20 Mark pieces in 1895.

== Banknotes ==
Between 1914 and 1915, Treasury Banknotes of New Guinea were issued for 5, 10, 20, 50 and 100 marks. All are extremely rare today.
