= HMAS Berrima =

Passenger liner (1913–1930)

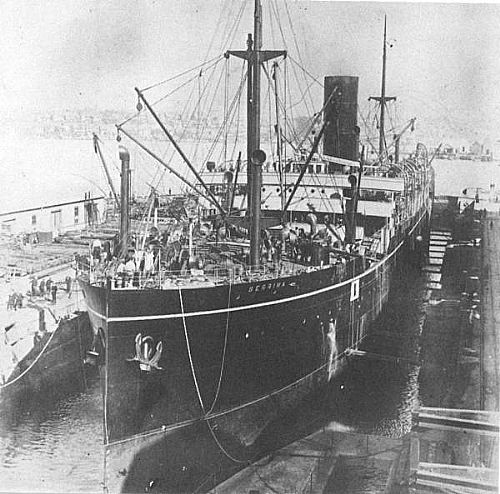
- Berrima under construction in 1913

History

Australia
- Owner: P&O
- Builder: Caird & Company, Greenock
- Launched: 13 September 1913
- Acquired: August 1914 by RAN
- Commissioned: 17 August 1914
- Decommissioned: 20 October 1914
- Out of service: 18 February 1917
- Honours and awards: Battle honours: Rabaul 1914
- Fate: converted to troop ship, later damaged

United Kingdom
- Name: Berrima
- Operator: P & O
- Acquired: 24 March 1920
- In service: 24 March 1920
- Fate: Sold for breaking up 1930

General characteristics
- Tonnage: 11,137 GRT
- Length: 500 ft 2 in (152.45 m)
- Beam: 62 ft 3 in (18.97 m)
- Draught: 38 ft (12 m)
- Propulsion: 2 × 4-cylinder quadruple expansion steam engines, 9,000 indicated horsepower (6,700 kW), twin screws
- Speed: 14 knots (26 km/h; 16 mph)
- Capacity: Civilian service: 600 passengers; Naval service: 1,500 soldiers
- Armament: 4 × 4 in (102 mm) guns

HMAS Berrima was a passenger liner which served in the Royal Australian Navy (RAN) during World War I as an armed merchantman and troop transport. Launched in 1913 as the P&O liner SS Berrima, the ship initially carried immigrants from the United Kingdom to Australia via Cape Town. In August 1914, Berrima was requisitioned for military use, refitted and armed, and commissioned into the RAN as an auxiliary cruiser. The ship transported two battalions of the Australian Naval and Military Expeditionary Force to the German New Guinea colonies in September.

Paid off from naval service in October 1914, Berrima then sailed as part of the second Anzac troop convoy; in addition to carrying soldiers to the Middle East, the ship towed the submarine AE2. Berrima continued to work under the liner requisition scheme until 18 February 1917, when she was torpedoed. She was towed ashore and repaired, then requisitioned by the Shipping Controller as a stores and munitions ferry. Berrima returned to P&O service in 1920, and resumed the expatriate run. This continued until the route's cancellation in 1929. Berrima was sold for breaking up in 1930.

== Construction and early career ==
The P&O passenger liner SS Berrima was built by Caird & Company, Greenock. The 11,137 gross register ton vessel was one of five B-class passenger liners ordered for P&O's emigrant service from the United Kingdom to Australia via Cape of Good Hope, a route acquired when the company took ownership of the Blue Anchor Line in 1910. Berrima was 500 feet 2 inches (152.45 m) in length, with a beam of 62 feet 3 inches (18.97 m), and a draught of 38 ft (12 m). Propulsion machinery consisted of two 4-cylinder quadruple expansion steam engines producing 9,000 indicated horsepower (6,700 kW), connected to twin screws, with a top speed of 14 knots (26 km/h; 16 mph). The ship had permanent accommodation for 350 third-class passengers, plus room for another 250 passengers in temporary accommodation.

Berrima was launched on 20 September 1913, and delivered to P&O on 5 December. The liner sailed from London later that month on her maiden voyage, calling at Cape Town, Adelaide, and Melbourne before reaching Sydney.

== Military service ==
In August 1914, the ship was requisitioned for military service. Berrima was taken to Cockatoo Island Dockyard on 12 August for refitting, but instead of being converted into a troop transport as originally planned, the ship underwent a six-day conversion for naval service. The modifications included converting holds into accommodation for 1,500 officers and soldiers, establishing a hospital was on the upper deck, and fitting four 4-inch (102 mm) BL naval guns and magazines, two on the forecastle, two on the poop deck. On 17 August, the ship was commissioned as the auxiliary cruiser HMAS Berrima, under the command of Commander J.B. Stevenson. The ship's civilian officer complement were inducted into the Royal Australian Naval Reserve, and the crew was supplemented by Royal Navy and RAN sailors.

Berrima left Sydney on 19 August 1914 carrying men of the Australian Naval and Military Expeditionary Force, consisting of a battalion of 1,000 infantry and a small battalion of 500 RAN Reservists and time-expired Royal Navy personnel, for operations against the German New Guinea colonies. Berrima met the naval units of the expeditionary force off Rossel Island on 9 September. Troops were landed at Herbertshöhe and Rabaul on 11 and 12 September respectively, and on the New Guinea mainland near Madang on 24 September. The ship was retroactively awarded the battle honour "Rabaul 1914" in March 2010 to recognise these landings. Berrima subsequently returned to Sydney and, despite plans to employ her as an armed merchant cruiser, was paid off on 20 October 1914. She was converted to a troop transport in November 1914.

In her new role, His Majesty's Australian Troop Transport (HMATT) Berrima sailed for the Middle East in December 1914 as part of the second troop convoy, carrying Australian and New Zealand troops and towing the submarine AE2. Berrima continued to work under the liner requisition scheme until 18 February 1917, when she was torpedoed in the English Channel off Portland with the loss of four lives. After the rest of the crew were evacuated by the destroyer HMS Forester, then towed into Portland Harbour, beached (due to the lack of drydock facilities), and repaired. The Commonwealth relinquished control on 10 October 1917. After being repaired she was requisitioned by the Shipping Controller for use as the Atlantic stores and munitions ferry service.

== Post-war career and fate ==
On 1 February 1920, while homeward bound, Berrima was stranded off Margate due to an error by the harbour pilot. She was refloated the next evening. Berrima was returned to commercial service on 24 March 1920, and was subsequently employed on the P&O Branch Line. On 26 April 1929, Berrima departed on her final voyage to Australia, after which P&O shut down the UK to Australia via Cape Town route.

On 16 July 1930, she was sold for £29,000 to Japanese shipbreakers Asakichi Kitagawa, for breaking up in Osaka.

== Commemoration ==
Australian rules footballer Bob Quinn was given the middle name "Berrima" in honour of the ship.
