= Rabaul (Bita Paka) War Cemetery =

Military cemetery in Kokopo, East New Britain, Papua New Guinea

- Commonwealth War Graves Commission
- Used for those deceased 1945
- Location: 4.4071°S 152.2991°E near Rabaul, New Britain, Papua New Guinea
- Total burials: 1,114
- Unknowns: 495

Burials by nation
- Australia and Commonwealth of Nations

Burials by war
- World War I and World War II

The Rabaul (Bita Paka) War Cemetery, established in 1945, is located near the site of the former Bita Paka wireless station south of the city of Rabaul, New Britain, in Papua New Guinea. The cemetery is managed by the Commonwealth War Graves Commission. The cemetery contains the Australian and Commonwealth graves of those killed during operations in New Britain and New Ireland during World War II, or who died while prisoners of war.

The cemetery also contains World War I Australian and German graves of those killed during operations in the Occupation of German New Guinea, which were relocated to the cemetery.

== Notable burials ==
- Jack Emanuel (1918–1971) – Recipient of the George Cross
- Sefanaia Sukanaivalu (1918–1944) – World War II recipient of the Victoria Cross
