= Naval Historical Society of Australia =

The Naval Historical Society of Australia offers research facilities to its membership, which is open to all with an interest in the subject.

Its aims and objectives are:

"To research, record and collate the history of all Navies, but particularly that of the Royal Australian Navy."
"To encourage and support Naval Museums."
"To promote and uphold the prestige, dignity and traditions of the Naval Service."

The Society publishes journals and website articles and organises activities for its members.
