= French cruiser Montcalm (1900) =

1902 French armoured cruiser

Montcalm
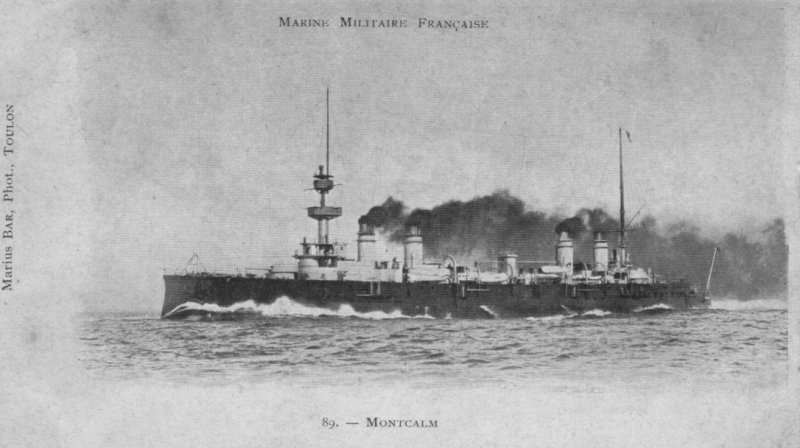
- A French postcard of Montcalm at speed

History

France
- Name: Montcalm
- Namesake: Louis-Joseph de Montcalm
- Builder: Forges et Chantiers de la Méditerranée
- Laid down: 27 September 1898
- Launched: 27 March 1900
- Commissioned: 24 March 1902
- Renamed: Trémintin, 26 September 1934
- Reclassified: Accommodation ship, 28 October 1928
- Stricken: 28 October 1926
- Fate: Sunk 16 August 1944

General characteristics
- Class & type: Gueydon-class armoured cruiser
- Displacement: 9,177 tonnes (9,032 long tons)
- Length: 137.97 m (452 ft 8 in)
- Beam: 19.38 m (63 ft 7 in)
- Draught: 7.67 m (25 ft 2 in)
- Installed power: 20,000 PS (15,000 kW); 20 Normand Sigaudy boilers
- Propulsion: 3 Shafts, 3 vertical triple-expansion steam engines
- Speed: 21 knots (39 km/h; 24 mph)
- Range: 8,500 nmi (15,700 km; 9,800 mi) at 10 knots (19 km/h; 12 mph)
- Complement: 566
- Armament: 2 × single 194 mm (7.6 in)/40 guns; 8 × single 164 mm (6.5 in)/45 guns; 4 × single 100 mm (3.9 in)/45 guns; 10 × single 47 mm (1.9 in)/55 guns; 4 × single 37 mm (1.5 in) guns; 2 × 450 mm (17.7 in) torpedo tubes
- Armour: Waterline belt: 80–150 mm (3.1–5.9 in); Deck: 30–55 mm (1.2–2.2 in); Gun turrets: 160–176 mm (6.3–6.9 in)

Montcalm was a Gueydon-class armoured cruiser built for the French Navy in the 1890s. The ship saw service during World War I in the Pacific. Following the war, Montcalm was used as an accommodation ship. In 1934, the vessel was renamed Trémintin and was sunk during World War II by British aircraft.

== Design and description ==
Designed by the naval architect Emile Bertin, the Gueydon-class ships were intended to fill the commerce-raiding strategy of the Jeune École. They measured 137.97 meters (452 ft 8 in) long overall with a beam of 19.38 meters (63 ft 7 in) and had a draught of 7.67 meters (25 ft 2 in). Montcalm displaced 9,177 metric tons (9,032 long tons). The ship had a crew of 566 officers and enlisted men.

The Gueydon class had three vertical triple-expansion steam engines, each driving a single propeller shaft. Steam for Montcalm's engines was provided by 20 Normand Sigaudy boilers and they were rated at a total of 20,000 metric horsepower (15,000 kW) that gave them a speed of 21 knots (39 km/h; 24 mph). The ships carried up to 1,575 metric tons (1,550 long tons; 1,736 short tons) of coal and could steam for 8,500 nautical miles (15,700 km; 9,800 mi) at a speed of 10 knots (19 km/h; 12 mph).

The ships of the Gueydon class had a main armament that consisted of two 40-caliber 194 mm (7.6 in) guns that were mounted in single gun turrets, one each fore and aft of the superstructure. Their secondary armament comprised eight 45-caliber quick-firing (QF) 164 mm (6.5 in) guns in casemates. For anti-torpedo boat defense, they carried four 45-caliber QF 100 mm (3.9 in) guns on the forecastle deck, as well as ten QF 47 mm (1.9 in) and four QF 37 mm (1.5 in) Hotchkiss guns. They were also armed with two submerged 450-millimetre (17.7 in) torpedo tubes.

The Harvey armor belt of the Gueydon-class cruisers covered most of the ships' hull. The lower strake of armor was generally 150 millimetres (5.9 in) thick, although it reduced to 91 millimetres (3.6 in) forward, 81 millimetres (3.2 in) aft, and thinned to 51 millimetres (2 in) at its lower edge. The upper strake of armor had thicknesses of 97–81 millimetres (3.8–3.2 in) and 56–41 millimetres (2.2–1.6 in) between the main and upper decks. The curved lower protective deck ranged in thickness from 51 to 56 millimetres. In addition there was a light armor deck 20 millimetres (0.8 in) thick at the top of the lower armor strake. A watertight internal cofferdam, filled with cellulose, stretched between these two decks. The gun turrets were protected by 160–176-millimetre (6.3–6.9 in) armor and had roofs 23 millimetres (0.9 in) thick. The 100-millimetre guns were protected by gun shields and the sides of the conning tower were 160 millimetres thick.

== Construction and career ==
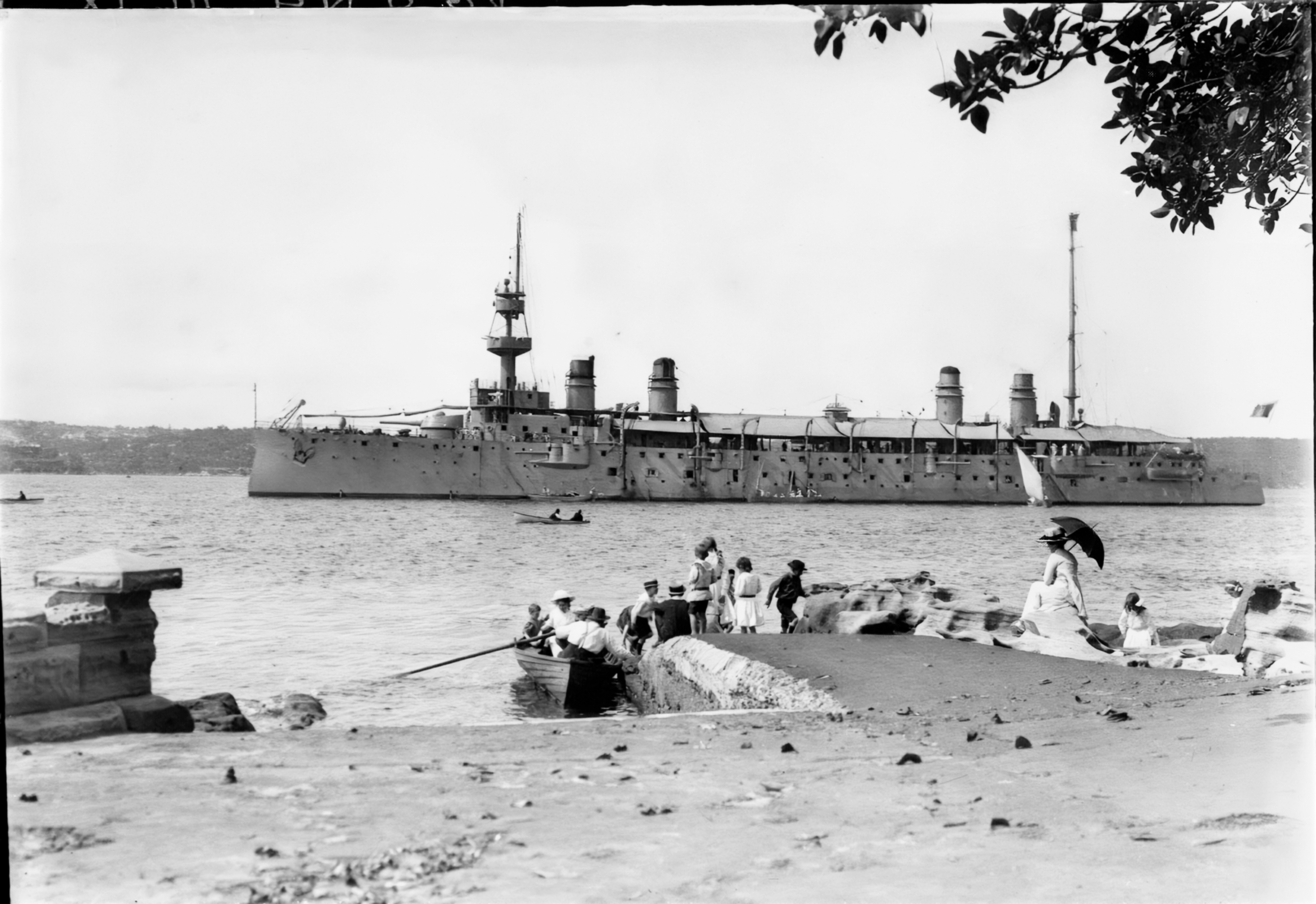
Montcalm in Sydney Harbour, ca. 1914

Laid down by Forges et Chantiers de la Méditerranée at their La Seyne-sur-Mer shipyard on 27 September 1898, she was launched on 27 March 1900 and was commissioned on 24 March 1902, before completing her trials, to ferry the President of the Republic, Émile Loubet, to Russia. Later that year she was commissioned for service in China, leaving Toulon in February 1903 and calling at Djibouti on her way out.

After the outbreak of World War I, Montcalm supported in the Australian capture of Rabaul in September 1914. She was decommissioned and hulked as an accommodation ship on 28 October 1926. The ship was renamed Trémintin on 26 September 1934. She was at Brest in 1940 and was there sunk by the Royal Air Force on 16 August 1944.
