= Eduard Haber =

German mining engineer and diplomat (1866–1947)

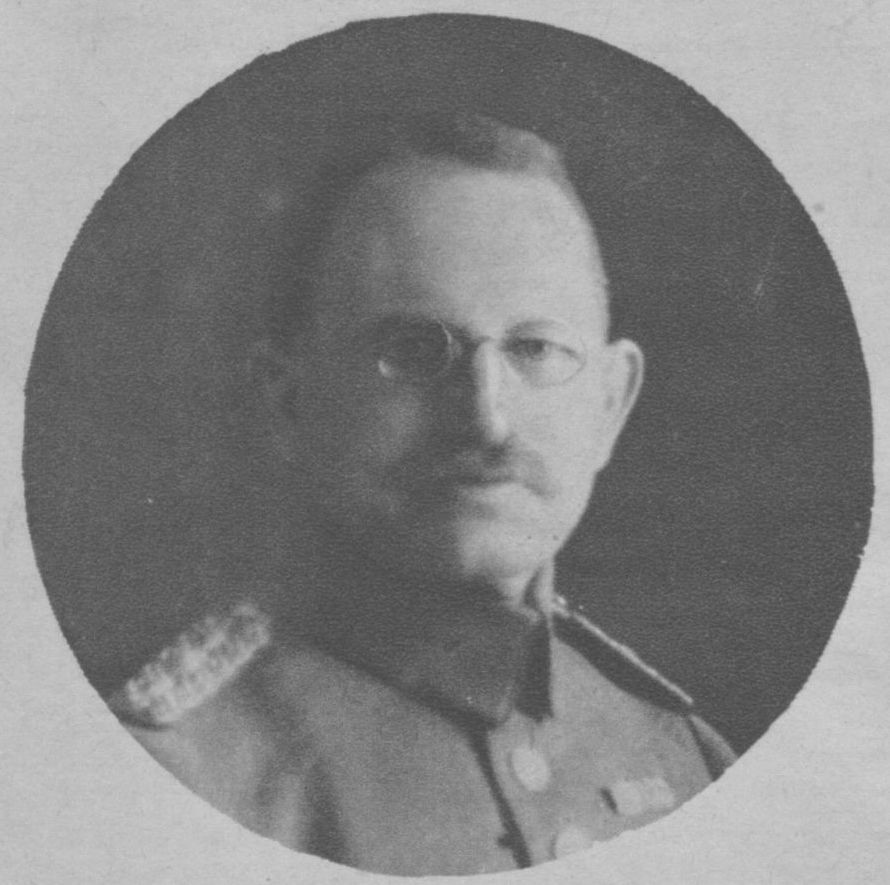

Acting Governor of German New Guinea
- In office 13 April 1914 – 17 September 1914
- Monarch: Wilhelm II
- Chancellor: Theobald von Bethmann Hollweg
- State Secretary of the Colonies: Wilhelm Solf
- Preceded by: Albert Hahl
- Succeeded by: William Holmes (Territory of New Guinea)

Personal details
- Born: 1 October 1866 Riesa, Kingdom of Prussia
- Died: 14 January 1947 (aged 80) Tübingen, Baden-Württemberg, Germany

Military service
- Allegiance: German Empire
- Years of service: 1914
- Battles/wars: World War I: Asian and Pacific Theater; Siege of Toma (surrendered)

Johann Karl Emil Eduard Haber (1 October 1866 – 14 January 1947) was a German civil servant who served as the last governor of German New Guinea. He was in an acting capacity in 1914, and was formally appointed in 1917.

== Early life ==
Eduard Haber was born in Riesa, Kingdom of Prussia, on 1 October 1866. He graduated from high school in 1884. He became a mining engineer like his father. He lost one of his eyes while working at a mine. He was a deputy smelting works inspector by 1900.

== Career ==
Haber joined the Imperial Colonial Service in 1901, and worked in German East Africa. He was appointed Government Councilor on 20 April 1902, and became the first advisor to Reichskommissar Gustav Adolf von Götzen in 1903.

=== Governor ===
Haber was the acting governor of German New Guinea in 1914. The KGS Komet transported Haber to Morobe for inspection. World War I broke out and the ship avoided capture by Australia before landing at Herbertshöhe. Haber placed the Komet at the disposal of Admiral Maximilian von Spee, but was captured on 11 October 1914. Haber moved his headquarters to a plantation at Toma to avoid capture. He signed terms of capitulation to Allied forces on 17 September, five months after arriving to the colony. Haber had a provision placed into the terms of surrender which had German civilian officials repatriated to Germany and paid for by the Australian government.

On 14 December 1917, Haber was formally appointed to replace Albert Hahl as governor in order to show that Germany was "not prepared to give up the colony". Hahl was given Haber's position of vortragender rat. Erich Ludendorff and Kaiser Wilhelm II opposed Haber's appointment.

After Germany's defeat in the war Haber was appointed to the colonial commission in Germany's pace delegation.

== Later life ==
Haber became a lecturer at the University of Tübingen in 1930. He called for Germany to be given League of Nations mandates in the 1930s. He supported the Nazi Party.

== Personal life ==
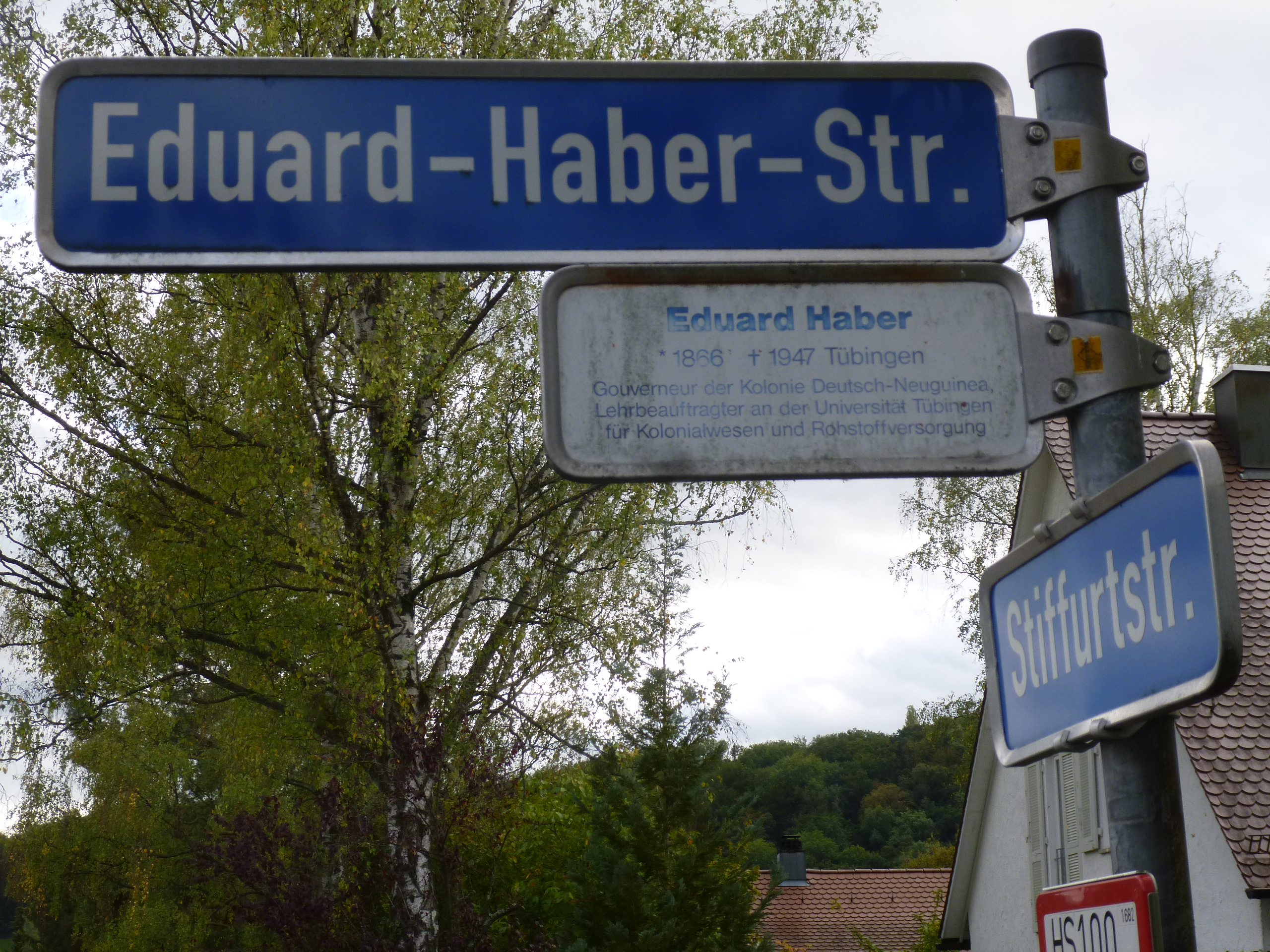
Eduard-Haber-Straße, Tübingen

On 1 October 1936, a street in Tübingen was named in Haber's honour.

== Works cited ==
=== Books ===
- Hiery, Hermann (2020). Fa'a Siamani: Germany in Micronesia, New Guinea and Samoa 1884-1914. Harrassowitz Verlag. ISBN 9783447114929.
- Hiery, Hermann (1995). The Neglected War: The German South Pacific and the Influence of World War I. University of Hawai'i Press. ISBN 0824816684.

=== Journals ===
- Sack, Peter (1990). "The End of the Hahl Era in German New Guinea: Voluntary Career Change or Removal from Office?". The Journal of Pacific History. 25 (2). Taylor & Francis: 227–232. doi:10.2307/25169040. JSTOR 25169040.

=== Web ===
- "German Imperial ensign: KGS 'Komet'". Australian War Memorial. Archived from the original on 22 November 2026.
- "Von Tübingen in die Welt? Eduard Haber und der Kolonialrevisionismus" [From Tübingen to the world? Eduard Haber and colonial revisionism] (in German). University of Tübingen. 18 February 2020. Archived from the original on 22 November 2026.
- Mennis, Mary (2015). "Raising the Flag in New Guinea". Naval Historical Society of Australia. Archived from the original on 22 November 2026.
