= German New Guinea =

German colony in northeast New Guinea (1884–1914)

Coordinates: 4.2°S 152.17°E

German New Guinea Deutsch-Neuguinea (German)
- 1884–1914
- Flag Coat of arms
- Anthem: "Heil dir im Siegerkranz" (German) (English: "'Hail to Thee in the Victor's Crown")
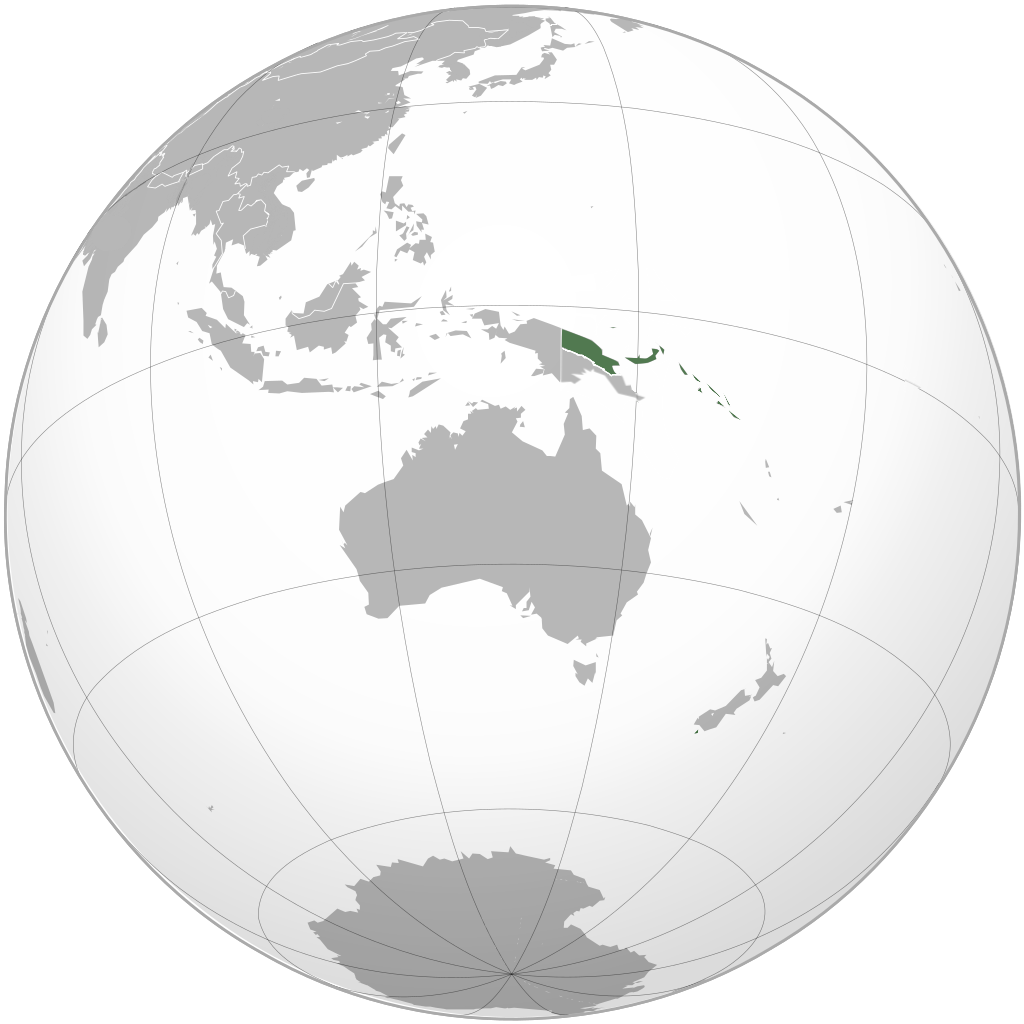
- German New Guinea before World War I
- Status: Colony of Germany
- Capital: Finschhafen (1884–1891); Friedrich-Wilhelmshafen (1891–1899); Herbertshöhe (1899–1910); Simpsonhafen (1910–1914)
- Common languages: German (official), Unserdeutsch, Papuan languages, Austronesian Languages
- Government: Dependent territory under direct rule and protectorates (after 1899)
- Emperor
  - 1884–1888: Wilhelm I
  - 1888: Friedrich III
  - 1888–1914: Wilhelm II
- Governor
  - 1884–1887: Gustav von Oertzen
  - 1899–1901: Rudolf von Bennigsen
  - 1914: Eduard Haber
- Historical era: German colonisation in the Pacific Ocean
  - Established: 3 November 1884
  - Direct control established: 12 February 1899
  - Australian occupation: 17 September 1914
  - Japanese occupation: 29 September 1914
  - Treaty of Versailles: 28 June 1919
  - Australian mandate commences: 17 December 1920

Area
- 1912 estimate: 249,500 km^{2} (96,300 sq mi)

Population
  - 1912 estimate: 600,000
- Currency: New Guinean mark
Preceded by
Spanish East Indies
Succeeded by
South Seas Mandate
British Solomon Islands
Mandate of Nauru
Territory of New Guinea

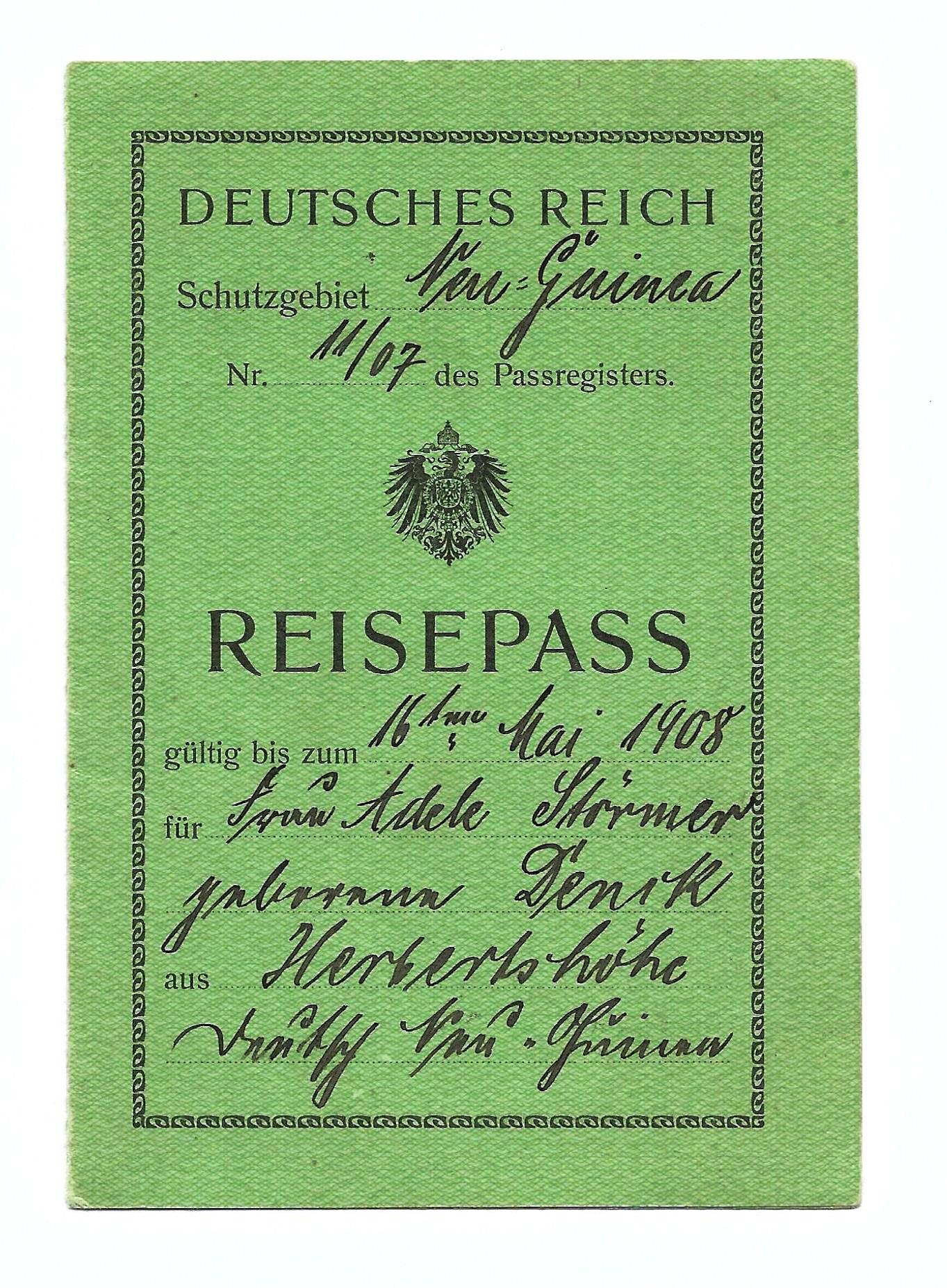
Exceptionally rare New Guinea passport

German New Guinea (German: Deutsch-Neuguinea) consisted of the northeastern part of the island of New Guinea and several nearby island groups, and was part of the German colonial empire. The mainland part of the territory, called Kaiser-Wilhelmsland, became a German protectorate in 1884. Other island groups were added subsequently. The Bismarck Archipelago (New Britain, New Ireland and several smaller islands), and the North Solomon Islands were declared a German protectorate in 1885. The Caroline Islands, Palau, and the Mariana Islands (except for Guam) were bought from Spain in 1899. German New Guinea annexed the formerly separate German Protectorate of Marshall Islands, which also included Nauru, in 1906. German Samoa, though part of the German colonial empire, was not part of German New Guinea.

Following the outbreak of World War I in 1914, Kaiser-Wilhelmsland and nearby islands fell to Australian forces, while Japan occupied most of the remaining German possessions in the Pacific. The mainland part of German New Guinea (Kaiser-Wilhelmsland), the Bismarck Archipelago and the North Solomon Islands are now part of Papua New Guinea. The Northern Mariana Islands are an unincorporated territory of the United States. The Carolines (as the Federated States of Micronesia), the Marshall Islands, Nauru and Palau are independent countries.

The islands to the east of Kaiser-Wilhelmsland, on annexation, were renamed the Bismarck Archipelago (formerly the New Britannia Archipelago) and the two largest islands renamed Neupommern ('New Pomerania', today's New Britain) and Neumecklenburg ('New Mecklenburg', now New Ireland). Due to their accessibility by water, however, these outlying islands were, and have remained, the most economically viable part of the territory.

With the exception of German Samoa, the German islands in the Western Pacific formed the "Imperial German Pacific Protectorates". These were administered as part of German New Guinea and included the Bismarck Archipelago (New Britain, New Ireland, and several smaller islands), the North Solomon Islands (Buka, Bougainville, and several smaller islands), the Carolines, Palau, the Marianas (except for Guam), the Marshall Islands, and Nauru. The total land area of German New Guinea was 249,500 square kilometres (96,300 sq mi).

== History ==
=== Early German South Pacific presence ===
The first Germans in the South Pacific were probably sailors on the crew of ships of the Dutch East India Company: during Abel Tasman's first voyage, the captain of the Heemskerck was one Holleman (or Holman), born in Jever in northwest Germany.

Hanseatic League merchant houses were the first to establish footholds in the South Pacific: Johann Cesar Godeffroy & Sohn of Hamburg, headquartered at Samoa from 1857, operated a South Seas network of trading stations especially dominating the copra trade and carrying German immigrants to various South Pacific settlements; in 1877 another Hamburg firm, Hernsheim and Robertson, established a German community on Matupi Island, in Blanche Bay (the north-east coast of New Britain) from which it traded in New Britain, the Caroline, and the Marshall Islands. By the end of 1875, one German trader reported: "German trade and German ships are encountered everywhere, almost at the exclusion of any other nation".

=== German colonial policy under Bismarck ===
In the late 1870s and early 1880s, an active minority, stemming mainly from a right-wing National Liberal and Free Conservative background, had organised various colonial societies all over Germany to persuade Chancellor Bismarck to embark on a colonial policy. The most important ones were the Kolonialverein of 1882 and the Society for German Colonization (Gesellschaft für Deutsche Kolonisation) founded in 1884. The reasons for Bismarck's lack of enthusiasm when it came to the subject of Germany's colonial possessions is reflected in his curt response in 1888 to the procolonial, expansionist remarks of Eugen Wolf, reflected in the latter's autobiography. After Bismarck had patiently listened to Wolf enthusiastically laying out his plans that he sought to pitch employing several illustrative maps, Bismarck finally interrupted his monologue:

Your map of Africa there is very nice I have to admit. But you know, my map of Africa is here ... in Europe. You see here is Russia, over there is [..] France. And us, we are here – right in the middle between those two. That's my map of Africa.

Despite his personal objections, it was Bismarck himself who eventually organised the acquisition of much of what would become the German colonial empire. The first attempts at the new policy came in 1884 when Bismarck had to put German trading interests in southwestern Africa under imperial protection. Bismarck told the Reichstag on 23 June 1884 of the change in German colonial policy: annexations would now proceed but by grants of charters to private companies.

=== Australian aspiration and British disinterest ===
The edition of 27 November 1882 of the Augsburger Allgemeine Zeitung carried an article which the Colonial Secretary of the British colony of New South Wales drew to the attention of the editor of the Sydney Morning Herald and, on 7 February 1883, the paper published a summary of the article under the heading "German annexation of New Guinea". The argument lifted from the German paper began by stating that New Guinea fell into the Australian sphere but had been neglected; although the Portuguese had explored in the 16th century, it was the Dutch from the 17th century "who seemed better satisfied with the country than other European nations had been" but they had over-reached themselves and had fallen back towards Java, Sumatra and Celebes. Recent explorations had given the basis for reconsideration: it "is considered useful by geology and biology people as holding in its forests the key to solve problems... a profitable field for cultivation" but London had only sent missionaries to save souls. "As we Germans have learnt a little about conducting colonial policy, and as our wishes and plans turn with a certain vivacity towards New Guinea... according to our opinion it might be possible to create out of the island a German Java, a great trade and plantation colony, which would form a stately foundation stone for a German colonial kingdom of the future."

The publication of the Sydney Morning Herald article caused a sensation and not just in the colony of New South Wales: over the border, in the British colony of Queensland where the shipping lanes of the Torres Strait and the beche-de-mer trade were of commercial significance. The Queensland Premier, Sir Thomas McIlwraith who led a political party "considered to represent the interests of the plantation owners in Queensland", drew it to the attention of the Queensland governor together with the general situation in New Guinea and urged annexation of the island. He also instructed the London Agent for Queensland to urge the Imperial Colonial Office to an act of annexation.

"Impatient with the lack of results from this procedure" Premier McIlwraith on his own authority ordered a Queensland Police Magistrate in March 1883 to proclaim the annexation on behalf of the Queensland government of New Guinea east of the Dutch boundary at 141E. When news of this reached London, the Secretary of State for the Colonies, Lord Derby promptly repudiated the act. When the matter came before Parliament, Lord Derby advised that the British Imperial Government "were not ready to annex New Guinea in view of its vast size and unknown interior, the certainty of native objections and administrative expense".

=== German New Guinea Company ===
Flag of the German New Guinea Company

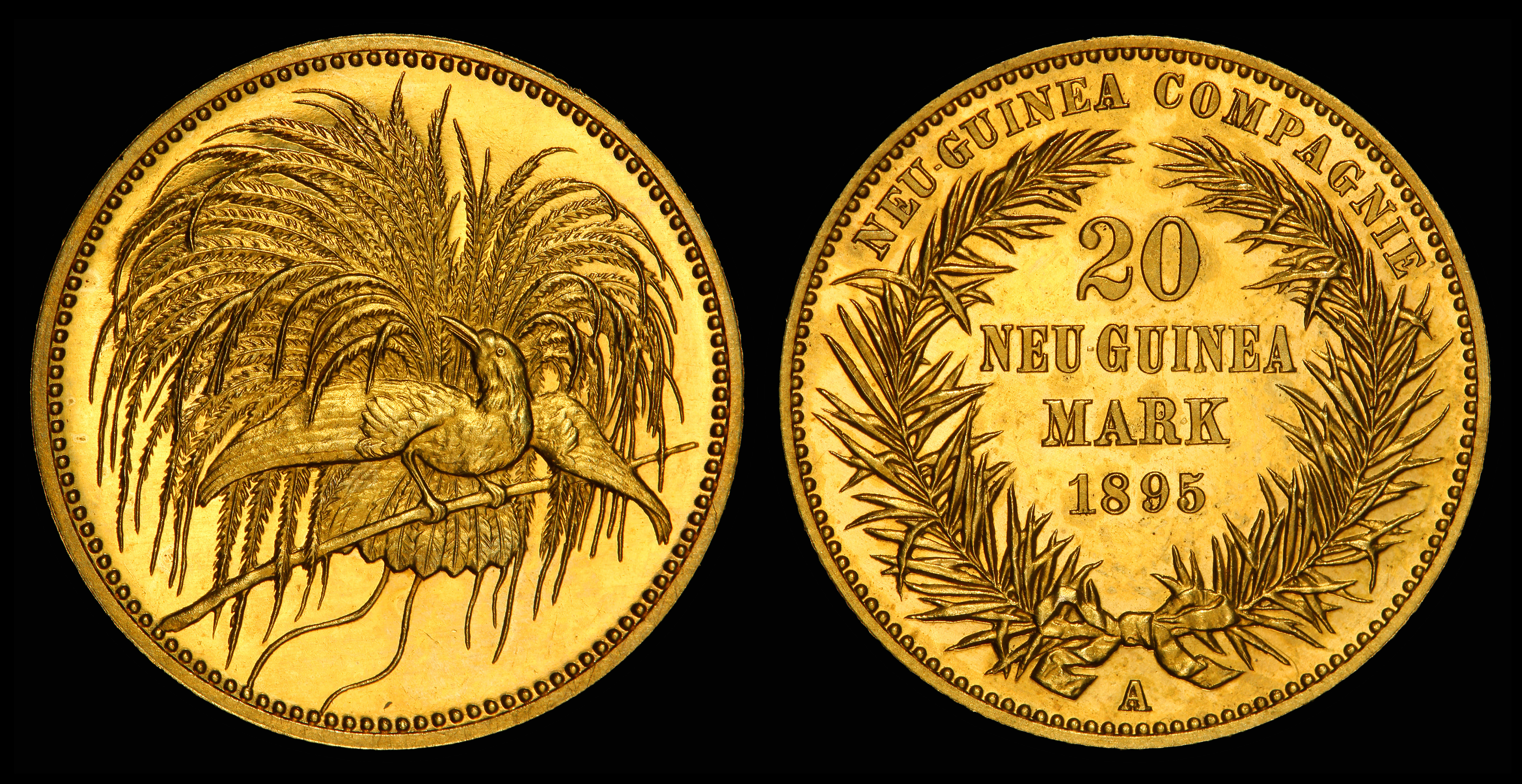
1895 20-mark gold coin issued by the German New Guinea Company

On his return to Germany from his 1879–1882 Pacific expedition, Otto Finsch joined a small, informal group interested in German colonial expansion into the South Seas led by the banker, Adolph von Hansemann. Finsch encouraged them to pursue the founding of a colony on the north-east coast of New Guinea and the New Britain Archipelago even providing them with an estimate of the costs of such a venture.

In 1884, the New Guinea Company was founded in Berlin by Adolph von Hansemann and a syndicate of German bankers for the purpose of colonizing and exploiting resources on Neuguinea (German New Guinea). On 3 November 1884, under the auspices of the Deutsche Neuguinea-Compagnie (German New Guinea Company), the German flag was flown over Kaiser-Wilhelmsland, the Bismarck Archipelago and the German Solomon Islands.

Albert Hahl (1868–1945) joined the German Colonial Office in 1895 and until 1914 played a major part in New Guinea's administration. He was an imperial judge at Herbertshöhe (1896–98), deputy governor of New Guinea (1899–1901), and governor (1902–14). As a judge he made three reforms: the appointment of 'luluais' [village chiefs], attempts to integrate the Tolais people into the European economy, and the protection of village lands, which led him to recommend the ending of all alienation of indigenous land. After 1901 Hahl attempted to apply his system to the whole of New Guinea, and although his success was limited, exports rose from one million marks in 1902 to eight million in 1914. He was forced to retire because of disagreements with Berlin officials, and became an active writer on New Guinea and was a leader in German colonial societies between the wars.

=== Catholic and Lutheran missions ===
By the mid-1880s German church authorities had devised a definite program for missionary work in New Guinea and assigned it to the Rhenish Mission, under the direction of Friedrich Fabri (1824–91), a Lutheran. The missionaries faced extraordinary difficulties, including repeated sickness, as well as psychological and sometimes violent tensions and fights between the colonial administration and the locals. The latter, at first, rejected European customs and norms of social behaviour, with few embracing Christianity. In 1921, the Rhenish Mission territory was handed over to the United Evangelical Lutheran Church of Australia.

Missionaries sponsored by the Catholic Church in Germany had better resources and influence, and proved more successful. They put more emphasis on tradition and less on modernisation, and were more in line with the world-views and traditions of the locals. European morality and discipline were often adopted, as were notions of dignity and prestige.

Table: German Mission societies in New Guinea

German Name	English	Latin	Abbreviation
Liebenzeller Mission ("China-Inland-Mission")	Liebenzell Mission	–	CIM
Maristen, Gesellschaft Mariens	Marist Mission, Marists	Societas Maristae	SM
Linked to German Wesleyan Churches	Methodist Mission, Australasian Methodist Mission Society, Wesleyan Society, Methodist Missionary Society of Australasia	–	–
Kongregation der Missionare vom Heiligsten Herzen Jesu, Hiltruper Mission, Herz-Jesu-Mission	Mission of the Most Sacred Heart of Jesus, Sacred Heart Mission, Holy Heart of Jesus	Congregatio Missionariorum Sacratissimi Cordis Jesu	MSC
Neuendettelsauer Mission, Gesellschaft für Innere und Äußere Mission im Sinne der Lutherischen Kirche e.V.	Neuendettelsau Mission, Lutheran Mission Finschhafen	–	ND
Rheinische Mission, Barmer Mission	Rhenish Mission	–	–
Steyler Mission, Gesellschaft des göttlichen Wortes (Kapuziner Mission)	Society of the Divine Word	Societas Verbi Divini	SVD
Missionsgesellschaft vom Heiligen Geist, Spiritaner, Väter vom Heiligen Geiste	Holy Spirit Fathers, Spiritans, Congregation of the (Servants of) the Holy Ghost.	Congregatio Sancti Spiritus	CSSp

=== Imperial German Pacific protectorates ===
German colonies in the Pacific, with German New Guinea in brown

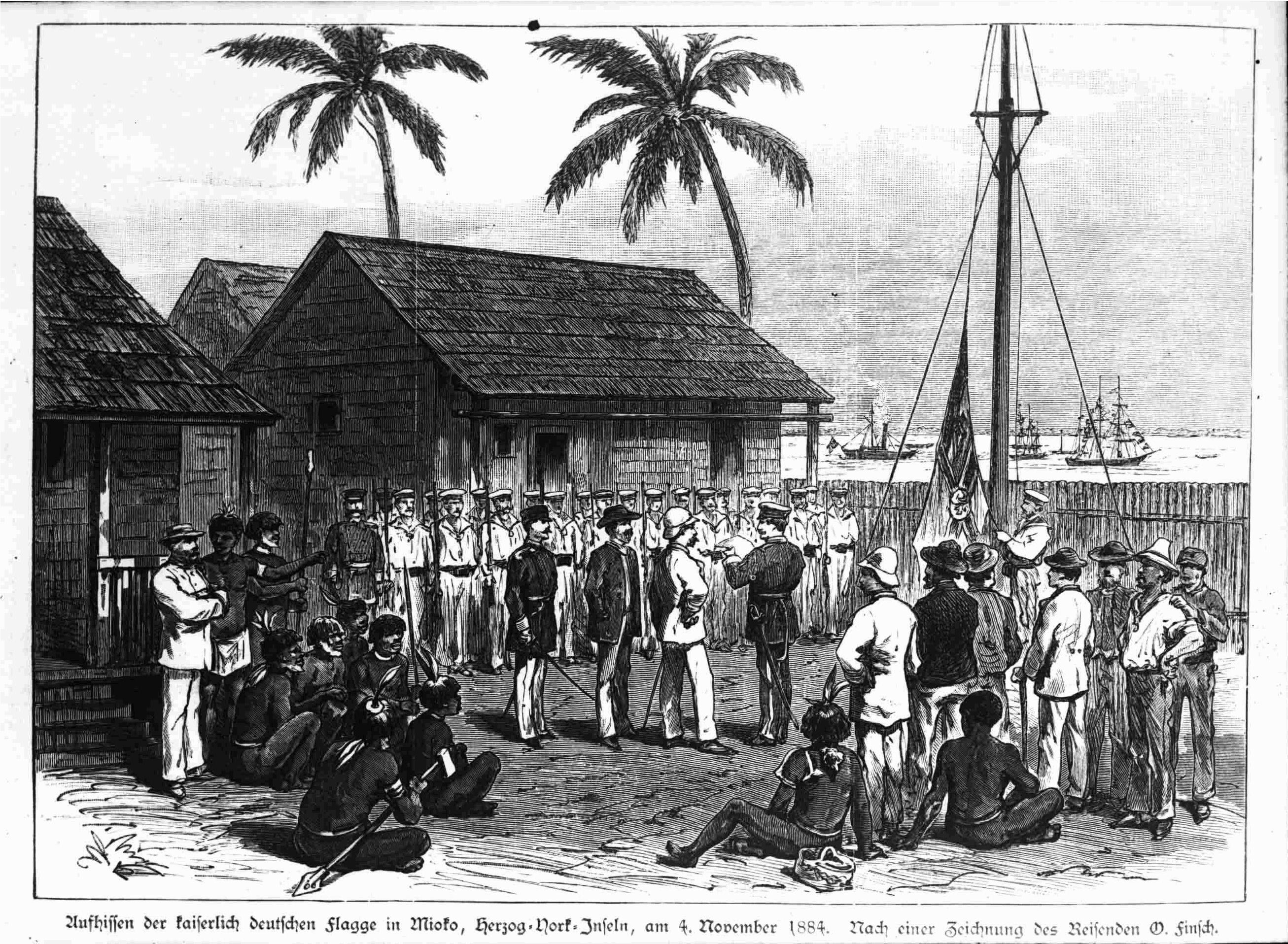
Hoisting of the German flag at Mioko in 1884

By the German–Spanish Treaty of 1899, Germany bought from Spain the Caroline Islands and the Mariana Islands (excluding Guam, which had been ceded to the US after the 1898 Spanish–American War) for 25 million pesetas (equivalent to 16,600,000 goldmarks). These islands became a protectorate and were administered from German New Guinea. The Marshall Islands, which had been a German protectorate since 1885, were annexed to German New Guinea in 1906.

=== Forced labour policy ===
To expand the highly profitable plantations, the Germans needed more workers. The government sent military expeditions to take direct control of more areas from 1899 to 1914. Instead of voluntary recruitment it became a matter of forced mobilisation. The government enforced new laws that required the tribes to furnish four weeks of labour per person annually and payment of a poll tax in cash, thereby forcing reluctant local inhabitants into the work force. The government did explore the choice of voluntary recruitment of labourers from China, Japan, and Micronesia, but only a few hundred came. After 1910 the government tried to ameliorate the impact by ending the recruitment of women in some areas and entirely closing other areas to recruiting. The planters protested German forced labor policies vehemently and initiated what would go on to be called the Sokehs rebellion. The government responded by sending 4 warships with 745 troops to defeat the Sokehs workers and impose the forced labour policy. They arrived in January 1911 and by February 1911 the Sokehs leader had surrendered.

=== World War I ===
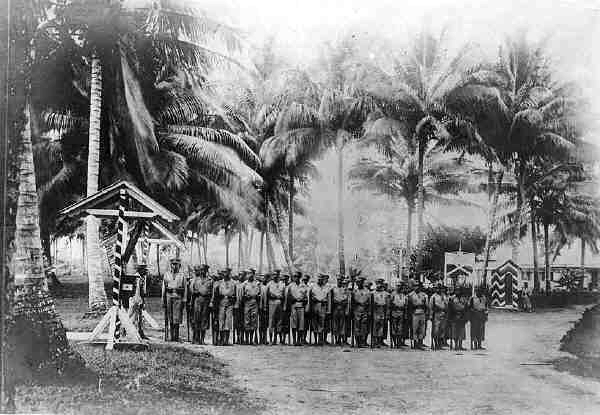
Recruits from the local population (here probably Tolai, from East New Britain) during a drill

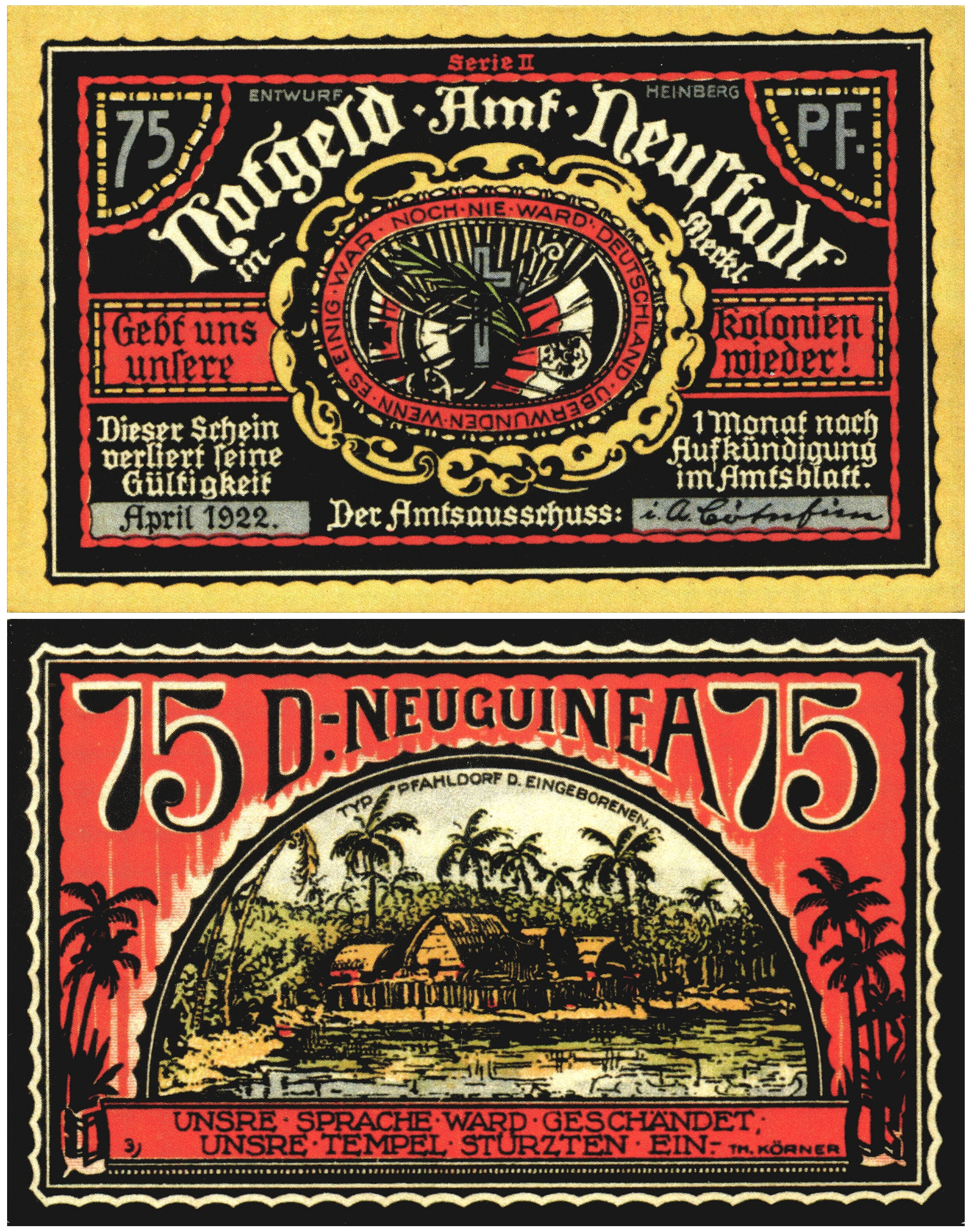
"Notgeld" banknote (1922). The text complains about the loss of the colony after the Treaty of Versailles.

Following the outbreak of World War I, Australian troops captured Kaiser-Wilhelmsland and the nearby islands in 1914, after a short resistance led by Captain Carl von Klewitz and Lt. Robert "Lord Bob" von Blumenthal, while Japan occupied most of the remaining German possessions in the Pacific. The only significant battle occurred on 11 September 1914 when the Australian Naval and Military Expeditionary Force attacked the low-power wireless station at Bita Paka (near Rabaul) on the island of New Britain, then Neu Pommern. The Australians suffered six dead and four wounded – the first Australian military casualties of the First World War. The German forces fared much worse, with one German officer and 30 local policemen killed and one German officer and ten local policemen wounded. On 21 September all German forces in the colony surrendered.

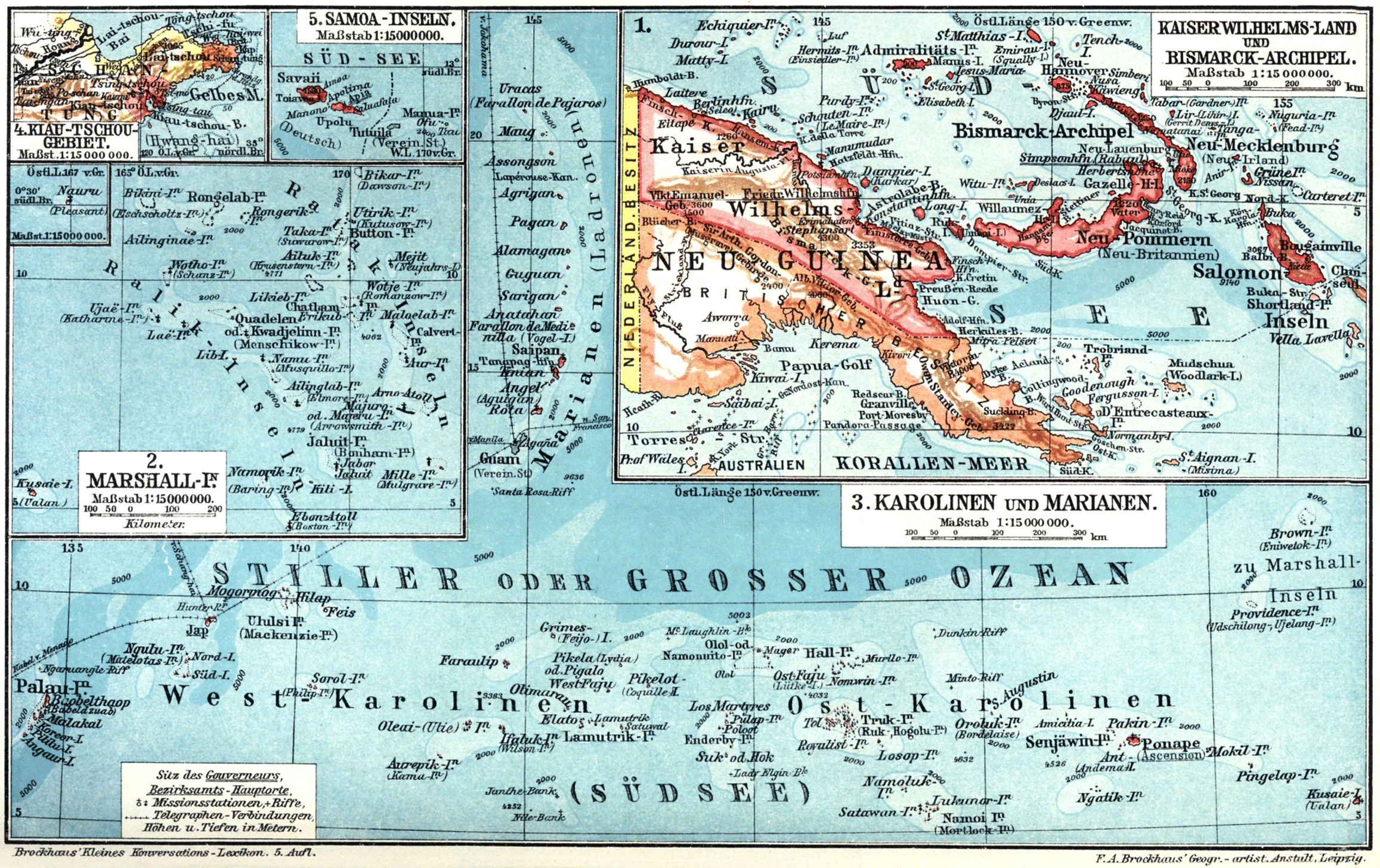
Map of Kaiserwilhelmsland, 1884–1919

However, Lieutenant (later Hauptmann) Hermann Detzner, a German officer, and some 20 local policemen evaded capture in the interior of New Guinea for the entire war. Detzner was on a surveying expedition to map the border with Australian-held Papua at the outbreak of war, and remained outside militarised areas. Detzner claimed to have penetrated the interior of the German portion (Kaiser Wilhelmsland) in his 1920 book Vier Jahre unter Kannibalen ("Four Years Among Cannibals"). These claims were heavily disputed by various German missionaries, and Detzner recanted most of his claims in 1932.

After the Treaty of Versailles of 1919, Germany lost all its colonial possessions, including German New Guinea. In 1923, the League of Nations gave Australia a trustee mandate over Nauru, with the United Kingdom and New Zealand as co-trustees. Other lands south of the equator became the Territory of New Guinea, a League of Nations Mandate Territory under Australian administration until 1949 (interrupted by Japanese occupation during the New Guinea campaign) when it was merged with the Australian territory of Papua to become the Territory of Papua and New Guinea, which eventually became modern Papua New Guinea. The islands north of the equator became the Japanese League of Nations Mandate for the South Seas Islands. After Japan's defeat in World War II, the former Japanese mandate islands were administered by the United States as the Trust Territory of the Pacific Islands, a United Nations trust territory.

== Territories ==
Territory	Period	Area (circa)	Current countries
Kaiser-Wilhelmsland	1884–1919	181,650 km^{2}	Papua New Guinea
Bismarck Archipelago	1899–1919	49,700 km^{2}	Papua New Guinea
Buka Island	1899–1919	492 km^{2}	Papua New Guinea
Bougainville Island	1899–1919	9,318 km^{2}	Papua New Guinea
Palau	1899–1919	466 km^{2}	Palau
Caroline Islands	1899–1919	2,150 km^{2}	Federated States of Micronesia; Palau
Nauru	1906–1919	21 km^{2}	Nauru
Mariana Islands	1899–1919	461 km^{2}	Northern Mariana Islands
Marshall Islands	1906–1919	181 km^{2}	Marshall Islands

== Planned symbols for German New Guinea ==
In 1914, a series of drafts were made for proposed coats of arms and flags for the German colonies. However, World War I broke out before the designs were finished and implemented, and the symbols were never actually put into use. Following its defeat in the war, Germany lost all its colonies, and the prepared coats of arms and flags were therefore never used.

Proposed flag

Proposed coat of arms

Related flag

== See also ==
- List of colonial heads of New Guinea
- British New Guinea
- Dutch New Guinea
- Unserdeutsch language
