= List of conflicts in Oceania =

Wikimedia list article

This is a list of conflicts in Oceania including armed conflicts that took place entirely within Oceania as well as regional or global conflicts in which Oceania was a theatre of conflict. It includes well-documented conflicts among indigenous peoples in the pre-colonial period; wars during the colonial period; and civil wars, coups, insurgencies and major episodes of violence during and since the decolonisation of Oceania. Conflicts are organised by country or territory in chronological order.

== Oceania-wide conflicts ==
- 1914–1918 World War I
  - 1914–1918 Asian and Pacific theatre of World War I
- 1939–1945 World War II
  - 1939–1945 Pacific Islands home front during World War II
  - 1941–1945 Pacific War

== Australasia ==
=== Australia ===
- 1788–1934 Australian frontier wars
  - 1790–1816 Hawkesbury and Nepean Wars
  - 1820s–1832 Black War
  - 1824 Bathurst War
  - 1827–1828 Corn Field Raids of 1827-1828
  - 1830–1850 Port Phillip District Wars
  - 1831–1833 Moreton Bay conflict
  - 1834–1859 Eumeralla Wars
  - 1843–1855 War of Southern Queensland
  - 1870–1890 Kalkadoon Wars
- 1804 Castle Hill convict rebellion
- 1808–1810 Rum Rebellion
- 1851–1854 Eureka Rebellion
- 1860–1861 Lambing Flat riots
- 1919 Red Flag riots
- 1920 Broome race riots
- 1932 Emu War
- 1939–1945 World War II
  - 1940–1945 Axis naval activity in Australian waters
  - 1942–1943 Japanese air raids on Australia

==== Cocos (Keeling) Islands ====
- 1914–1918 World War I
  - 1914 Battle of Cocos
- 1939–1945 World War II
  - 1942 Cocos Islands mutiny

==== Christmas Island ====
- 1939–1945 World War II
  - 1942 Battle of Christmas Island

==== Norfolk Island ====
- 1826–1846 Norfolk Island convict mutinies
  - 1826 rebellion
  - 1827 uprising
  - 1830 escape
  - 1834 rebellion
  - 1842 rebellion
  - 1846 Cooking Pot Uprising

=== New Zealand ===
- 16th century Ngāti Tūwharetoa invasion of Taupō
- 16th or 17th century Ngāti Tūwharetoa–Ngāti Whitikaupeka War
- c. 1600 Ngāti Tama–Ngāti Tūwharetoa War
- Mid 17th century Ngāti Raukawa–Ngāti Kahu-pungapunga War
- Late 18th century Tūhoe–Ngāti Tūwharetoa War
- c. 1807 Battle of Hingakaka
- 1810–1821 Sealers' War
- Early 1820s War of Te Kupenga
- 1807–1845 Musket Wars
  - c. 1807 Battle of Moremonui
  - 1828 Kaiuku
  - 1830 Girls' War
  - 1835–1863 Moriori genocide
  - 1839–1842 Ngāti Mutunga–Ngāti Tama conflict
- 1845–1872 New Zealand Wars
  - 1845 Flagstaff War
  - 1846 Hutt Valley campaign
  - 1847 Whanganui campaign
  - 1860–1861 First Taranaki War
  - 1863–1864 Invasion of the Waikato
  - 1863–1866 Second Taranaki War
  - 1864 Tauranga campaign
  - 1865–1866 East Cape War
  - 1868–1869 Tītokowaru's War
  - 1868–1872 Te Kooti's War
- 1898 Dog Tax War
- 1939–1945 World War II
  - 1940–1945 Axis naval activity in New Zealand waters

== Melanesia ==
=== Fiji ===
- 1840–1858 United States Fiji expeditions
  - 1840 Burning of Solevu and Tye
  - 1855 Fiji expedition
  - 1858 Fiji expedition
- 1855 Battle of Kaba
- 1871–1876 Colo Wars
- 1987 Fijian coups d'état
  - 1987 May coup
  - 1987 September coup
- 2000 Fijian coup d'état
- 2006 Fijian coup d'état

=== Papua New Guinea ===
- 1914–1918 World War I
  - 1914 Australian occupation of German New Guinea
- 1939–1945 World War II
  - 1942–1945 New Guinea campaign
- 2012 Papua New Guinea Defence Force mutiny
- 2021–present Highlands conflict
- 2022 Kiriwina Island clashes

==== Bougainville ====
- 1939–1945 World War II
  - 1943–1945 Bougainville campaign
- 1988–1998 Bougainville conflict

=== New Caledonia ===
- 1878 Ataï's War
- 1917 Kanak revolt
- 1976–1988 The Events
  - 1988 Ouvéa cave hostage taking
- 2024 New Caledonia unrest

=== Solomon Islands ===
- 1927 Malaita massacre
- 1939–1945 World War II
  - 1942–1945 Solomon Islands campaign
- 1998–2013 Ethnic tensions in Solomon Islands
  - 1998–2003 Violence in Guadalcanal
  - 2003–2013 Regional Assistance Mission to Solomon Islands
  - 2006 Riots following the 2006 Solomon Islands general election
- 2021 Solomon Islands unrest
- 2023 Solomon Islands protests

=== Vanuatu ===
- 1980 Coconut War

=== Western New Guinea ===
- 1780–1810 Nuku rebellion
- 1939–1945 World War II
  - 1942–1945 Western New Guinea campaign
- 1945–1949 Indonesian National Revolution
- 1950–1962 Western New Guinea dispute
  - 1962 Battle of Arafura Sea
- 1962–present Papua conflict

== Micronesia ==
=== Federated States of Micronesia ===
- 1910–1911 Sokehs Rebellion
- 1914–1918 World War I
  - 1914 Japanese occupation of German Pacific islands
- 1939–1945 World War II
  - 1942–1944 Gilbert and Marshall Islands campaign

=== Guam ===
- 1670–1699 Spanish–Chamorro Wars
- 1898 Spanish–American War
  - 1898 Capture of Guam
- 1939–1945 World War II
  - 1941 Battle of Guam
  - 1944 Mariana and Palau Islands campaign

=== Kiribati ===
- 1841 Battle of Drummond's Island
- 1939–1945 World War II
  - 1941–1945 Japanese occupation of the Gilbert Islands
  - 1942–1944 Gilbert and Marshall Islands campaign

=== Marshall Islands ===
- 1914–1918 World War I
  - 1914 Japanese occupation of German Pacific islands
- 1939–1945 World War II
  - 1942–1944 Gilbert and Marshall Islands campaign

=== Naoero ===
- 1878–1888 Nauruan Civil War
- 1914–1918 World War I
  - 1914 Australian occupation of Nauru
- 1939–1945 World War II
  - 1940 German attacks on Nauru
  - 1942–1945 Japanese occupation of Nauru

=== Northern Mariana Islands ===
- 1670–1699 Spanish–Chamorro Wars
- 1914–1918 World War I
  - 1914 Japanese occupation of German Pacific islands
- 1939–1945 World War II
  - 1944 Mariana and Palau Islands campaign

=== Palau ===
- 1914–1918 World War I
  - 1914 Japanese occupation of German Pacific islands
- 1939–1945 World War II
  - 1944 Mariana and Palau Islands campaign

== Polynesia ==
=== American Samoa ===
- 1886–1894 First Samoan Civil War
  - 1887–1889 Samoan crisis
- 1898–1899 Second Samoan Civil War

=== French Polynesia ===
- 1844–1847 Franco-Tahitian War
- 1887–1897 Leewards War
- 1914–1918 World War I
  - 1914 Bombardment of Papeete

=== Hawaii ===
- 1782–1810 Unification of Hawaii
- 1839 Laplace affair
- 1843 Paulet affair
- 1849 French invasion of Honolulu
- 1874 Honolulu Courthouse riot
- 1887–1895 Hawaiian rebellions
  - 1887 Rebellion of 1887
  - 1889 Wilcox rebellion of 1889
  - 1893 Overthrow of the Hawaiian Kingdom
  - 1893 Leper War on Kauaʻi
  - 1895 Wilcox rebellion
- 1939–1945 World War II
  - 1941 Attack on Pearl Harbor

=== Samoa ===
- 1841 Bombardment of Upolu
- 1886–1894 First Samoan Civil War
  - 1887–1889 Samoan crisis
- 1898–1899 Second Samoan Civil War
- 1914–1918 World War I
  - 1914 Occupation of German Samoa
- 1929 Black Saturday

=== Tonga ===
- 2006 Nukuʻalofa riots

=== Wallis and Futuna ===
- 1939–1945 World War II
  - 1942–1945 Allied occupation of Wallis
