= Australian occupation of German New Guinea =

1914 World War I campaign

- Part of the Asian and Pacific theatre of World War I
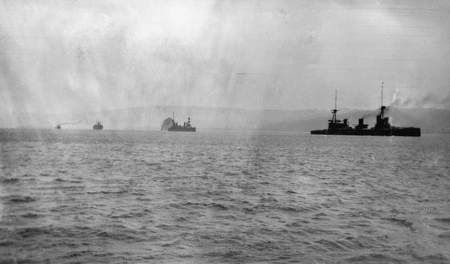
- Australian Fleet entering Simpson Harbour in 1914.
Date	9 September – 21 October 1914
Location	German New Guinea
Result	Australian victory

Belligerents
Australia	German Empire; German New Guinea

Commanders and leaders
(Australia) William Holmes (United Kingdom of Great Britain and Ireland) George Patey	(German New Guinea) Carl von Klewitz (German New Guinea) Robert von Blumenthal (German Empire) Albert Hahl

Strength
2,000	500

Casualties and losses
Australian invasion of German New Guinea: 39 killed; 12 wounded; 1 submarine missing	Australian invasion of German New Guinea: 85 killed; 15 wounded

The Australian occupation of German New Guinea occurred in the early stages of World War I when the colony was seized by the Australian Naval and Military Expeditionary Force.

The colony of German New Guinea was poorly defended and the invasion met with limited resistance, with the Battle of Bita Paka in September 1914 being the only major engagement. Australian forces subsequently seized the island of Nauru in November 1914. Germany's other possessions in the Pacific were invaded by Allied forces in separate actions around the same time, including the New Zealand occupation of German Samoa and Japanese occupation of Micronesia.

German New Guinea remained under Australian military occupation until the end of the war, when it was made a League of Nations mandate and a civilian administration was established for the new Territory of New Guinea.

== Background ==
=== German New Guinea ===
German New Guinea (German: Deutsch-Neuguinea) was an Imperial German protectorate from 1884. German New Guinea consisted of the territories of the northeastern part of New Guinea (German: Kaiser-Wilhelmsland) and the nearby Bismarck Archipelago, consisting of New Britain (German: Neu-Pommern) and New Ireland (German: Neu-Mecklenburg). Together with the other Western Pacific German islands, excluding German Samoa, they formed the Imperial German Pacific Protectorates. The protectorate included the German Solomon Islands, the Caroline Islands, Palau, the Mariana Islands (except for Guam), the Marshall Islands and Nauru. Imperial Germany had a paramilitary police force, the Polizeitruppe, in New Guinea; generally used to keep up order and put down rebellions. The Polizeitruppe at Bita Paka consisted of about 50 German officers, NCOs and reservists and 240 native police soldiers. Rabaul was well stocked with the coal for use by the German East Asia Squadron.

=== Australian Military situation ===
At the outbreak of World War I, the East Asia Squadron, consisting of the armored cruisers Scharnhorst and Gneisenau and the light cruisers Nürnberg, Leipzig, Dresden and Emden, under the command of Vice-Admiral Maximilian von Spee, was cruising in the Pacific Ocean. Britain had already severed all German undersea cables passing through British controlled areas. Concerned about possible attacks against Allied merchant shipping in the region, Britain requested that Australia destroy the German wireless stations and coaling stations in the Pacific.

Australia hurriedly raised the Australian Naval & Military Expeditionary Force (ANMEF), consisting of one battalion of infantry of 1,000 men enlisted in Sydney, known as the 1st Battalion, ANMEF and 500 naval reservists and ex-sailors who would serve as infantry. Another battalion of militia from the Queensland based Kennedy Regiment, which had been hurriedly dispatched to garrison Thursday Island, also contributed 500 volunteers to the force. The ANMEF was tasked with the capture of the Imperial German Pacific Protectorates within six months. This included capturing or destroying the radio stations and coal stations supporting the East Asia Squadron.

Reconnaissance of the area was undertaken by the Australia Squadron, consisting of the battlecruiser HMAS Australia, the second-class protected cruiser HMAS Encounter, the light cruisers HMAS Melbourne and Sydney and the destroyers HMAS Parramatta, Yarra, and Warrego. Under the command of Vice Admiral Sir George Patey, the destroyers entered Blanche Bay on 12 August. HMAS Australia captured Sumatra and HMAS Encounter captured Zambesi while patrolling St Georges Channel on 12 August. HMAS Melbourne requisitioned the cargo of coal of the collier Alconda off Rossel Island on 13 August.

The destroyers entered Simpson Harbour and Matupi Harbour at night searching for the East Asia Squadron. Landing parties from the destroyers were sent ashore to demolish the telephones in the post offices in Rabaul and at the German gubernatorial capital of Herbertshöhe (now Kokopo), located 20 miles (32 km) to the south-east. Unable to locate the radio station, the Australian warships threatened to bombard nearby settlements if the radio station continued to transmit, before withdrawing.

== Military engagements ==
=== New Britain ===
==== Battle of Bita Paka ====
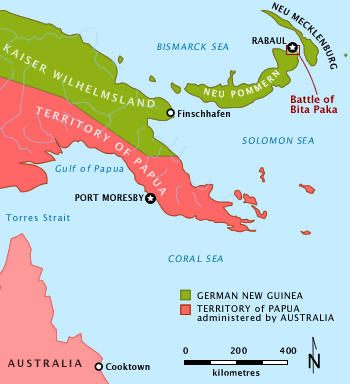
Battle of Bita Paka, 1914

The Battle of Bita Paka took place on 11 September, during an Australian attempt to capture the German wireless station. A mixed force of German officers and Melanesian police mounted a stout resistance and forced the Australians to fight their way to the objective. After a day of fighting in which both sides suffered casualties, the more numerous Australian forces finally succeeded in capturing and destroying the wireless station.

==== Siege of Toma ====
The Siege of Toma took place between 14–17 September, when troops of the ANMEF surrounded Toma. They finally brought up a 12-pound field piece to bombard it, which caused the German garrison to negotiate a surrender.

=== New Guinea ===
==== Madang ====
Madang was captured without opposition on 24 September by Australia.

=== Nauru ===
Australian forces first landed in Nauru on 9 September and fully occupied it by 6 November without German opposition.

== Related actions ==
Japanese forces were originally told not to occupy islands but following Tanin Yamaya occupying Jaluit Atoll on 29 September Japan decided to occupy the islands not only to destroy the radio stations there but also in search of the east Asia squadron. Rota was the last Island occupied by Japanese forces on 21 October, ending the New Guinea campaign.

== Aftermath ==
Organized and completed with remarkable speed, the occupation of German New Guinea was significant as the first independent military operation carried out by Australia.

Lieutenant Hermann Detzner, a German officer with some 20 native policemen, evaded capture in the interior of New Guinea and managed to remain free for the entire war. After the Treaty of Versailles of 1919, the victorious Allies divided all German's colonial possessions among themselves. German New Guinea became the Territory of New Guinea, a League of Nations Mandate Territory under Australian administration.

== See also ==
- Australian occupation of German New Guinea order of battle
