= Australian occupation of German New Guinea order of battle =

This is an order of battle listing the Australian and German Empire forces during the Australian occupation of German New Guinea between September and November 1914.

== Australian forces ==
=== Naval forces ===
Vice Admiral George Patey

- Battlecruisers
  - HMAS Australia
- Second class protected cruisers
  - HMAS Encounter
- Light cruisers
  - HMAS Melbourne
  - HMAS Sydney
- Destroyers
  - HMAS Parramatta
  - HMAS Yarra
  - HMAS Warrego
- Submarines
  - HMAS AE1 (lost at sea)
  - HMAS AE2
- Submarine tenders
  - HMAS Protector
  - HMAS Upolu
- Supply vessels
  - SS Aorangi
- Colliers
  - HMAS Koolonga
  - SS Whangape
  - SS Waihora
- Oilers
  - SS Murex
- Troop transports
  - HMAS Berrima – Commander J.B. Stevenson
  - HMAT Kanowna (left at Port Moresby)

=== Landing forces ===
Colonel William Holmes

- Australian Naval and Military Expeditionary Force
  - 1st Battalion, Australian Naval and Military Expeditionary Force – 1000 troops
  - 6 companies of RAN Naval Reserve – Commander J.A.H. Beresford – 500 troops
  - Kennedy Regiment – 500 troops (left at Port Moresby)
  - 2 machine gun sections
  - Signal section
  - AAMC detachment

== German Empire forces ==
Rittmeister Carl von Klewitz
Lt. Robert von Blumenthal

- Polizeitruppe
