= Japanese occupation =

Japanese occupation may refer to:

- Japanese occupation of the Aleutian Islands
  - Japanese occupation of Attu
  - Japanese occupation of Kiska
- Japanese occupation of the Andaman and Nicobar Islands
- Japanese occupation of British Borneo (territories now part of East Malaysia and Brunei)
- Japanese occupation of Burma
- Japanese occupation of Cambodia
- Japanese occupation of the Dutch East Indies (territories now part of Indonesia and East Timor)
  - Japanese occupation of West Sumatra
- Japanese occupation of the Gilbert Islands
- Japanese occupation of German colonial Empire possessions
  - Japanese occupation of Mariana Islands, Marshall Islands, Palau Islands, Caroline Islands.
    - South Seas Mandate
  - Australian-Japanese occupation of German New Guinea
- Japanese occupation of Guam
- Japanese occupation of Gyeongbokgung
- Japanese occupation of Hong Kong
- Japanese occupation of Istanbul
- Japanese occupation of Ryukyu (1609)
- Japanese occupation of Ryukyu (1879)
- Japanese occupation of Jinan (Part of China)
- Japanese occupation of Korea (1592-1598)
- Japanese occupation of Korea (1875)
- Japanese occupation of Korea (1905)
- Japanese occupation of Korea (1910)
  - Korea under Japanese rule (1910-1945)
- Japanese occupation of Laos
- Japanese occupation of Malaya (territories now part of peninsular Malaysia)
- Japanese occupation of Nauru
- Japanese occupation of the Philippines
- Japanese occupation of Singapore
- Japanese occupation of Taiwan (1874)
- Japanese occupation of Taiwan (1895)
  - Taiwan under Japanese rule (1895-1945)
- Japanese occupation of Thailand
- Japanese occupation of Tsingtao
- Japanese occupation of Vietnam
- Japanese occupation of various parts of Ming dynasty and Josen during the Japanese invasions of Korea (1592–1598)
- Japanese occupation of various parts of Josen during the Donghak Peasant Revolution.
- Japanese occupation of various parts of Qing dynasty and Josen during the First Sino-Japanese War.
- Japanese occupation of various parts of Qing dynasty during the Boxer Rebellion.
  - Japanese occupation of Qing
- Japanese occupation of various parts of Qing dynasty, Korean Empire and Russian Empire during the Russo-Japanese War.
- Japanese occupation of various parts of Russian Empire and Soviet Union during the Siberian intervention. Japanese occupied all ports and major towns in the Russian Maritime Provinces and in Siberia east of the city of Chita.
  - Japanese intervention in Siberia
    - Japanese occupation of northern Sakhalin
    - Japanese occupation of Vladivostok
- Japanese occupation of various parts of Republic of China (Japanese occupation of China) during the Second Sino-Japanese War.
  - Japanese occupation of Beijing
  - Japanese occupation of Shanghai
- Japanese occupation of Manchuria; see Manchukuo, a Japanese puppet state in northeastern China.
- Alled Occupation of Iraq
  - Japanese Iraq Reconstruction and Support Group (This is a de facto Japanese occupation of Iraq).
- U.S. occupation of Japan, the occupation of Japan by United States of America following World War II. This foreign presence marks the only time in the history of Japan that it has been occupied by a foreign power.

== See also ==
- Japanese occupation government (disambiguation)
- Japanese colonial empire
- Korea under Japanese rule
- South Seas Mandate
- Taiwan under Japanese rule
