= SMS Arcona (1902) =

Light cruiser of the German Imperial Navy

- Arcona passing under the Levensau High Bridge in the Kaiser Wilhelm Canal

History

German Empire
- Name: Arcona
- Namesake: Cape Arkona
- Builder: AG Weser, Bremen
- Laid down: 1901
- Launched: 22 April 1902
- Commissioned: 12 May 1903
- Decommissioned: February 1920

History

Weimar Germany
- Recommissioned: 25 May 1921
- Decommissioned: 1 December 1923
- Stricken: 15 January 1930

History

Nazi Germany
- Recommissioned: As anti-aircraft battery, May 1940
- Fate: Scuttled, 3 May 1945; Scrapped in 1948

General characteristics (As built)
- Class & type: Gazelle-class cruiser
- Displacement: Normal: 2,706 t (2,663 long tons); Full load: 3,180 t (3,130 long tons)
- Length: 105 m (344 ft 6 in) loa
- Beam: 12.4 m (40 ft 8 in)
- Draft: 4.99 m (16 ft 4 in)
- Installed power: 8 × water-tube boilers; 8,000 PS (7,900 ihp)
- Propulsion: 2 × triple-expansion steam engines; 2 × screw propellers
- Speed: 21.5 knots (39.8 km/h; 24.7 mph)
- Range: 4,400 nmi (8,100 km; 5,100 mi) at 12 kn (22 km/h; 14 mph)
- Complement: 14 officers; 256 enlisted men
- Armament: 10 × 10.5 cm (4.1 in) SK L/40 guns; 2 × 45 cm (17.7 in) torpedo tubes
- Armor: Deck: 20 to 25 mm (0.79 to 0.98 in); Conning tower 80 mm (3.1 in); Gun shields: 50 mm (2 in)

General characteristics (1940 configuration)
- Armament: 1 x 10.5 cm SK C/32 gun; 4 x 10.5 cm SK C/33 guns; 2 x 3.7 cm (1.5 in) SK C/30 guns; 4 x 2 cm (0.79 in) Flak 30/38 guns

SMS Arcona was the ninth member of the ten-ship Gazelle class of light cruisers that were built for the German Kaiserliche Marine (Imperial Navy) in the late 1890s and early 1900s. The Gazelle class was the culmination of earlier unprotected cruiser and aviso designs, combining the best aspects of both types in what became the progenitor of all future light cruisers of the Imperial fleet. Built to be able to serve with the main German fleet and as a colonial cruiser, she was armed with a battery of ten 10.5 cm (4.1 in) guns and a top speed of 21.5 knots (39.8 km/h; 24.7 mph). Arcona was a modified version of the basic Gazelle design, with improved armor and additional coal storage for a longer cruising range.

Arcona served in all three German navies over the course of a career that spanned more than forty years. After commissioning in 1903, she served with the fleet's reconnaissance force until early 1907, when she was decommissioned, overhauled, and then sent to the East Asia Squadron. During her deployment abroad, she was involved in the suppression of a revolt against colonial rule in German Samoa in 1909. She was recalled to Germany in 1910 and thereafter modified for use as a minelaying cruiser; during World War I, she operated in this capacity in the mouth of the Ems, while also fulfilling secondary duties. She saw no action during the war.

Following Germany's defeat, Arcona was converted into a mother ship for minesweepers tasked with clearing the minefields that had been laid in the North Sea as mandated by the Treaty of Versailles. After the work was completed in 1920, she was restored to cruiser configuration and she served briefly with the German fleet in the North Sea before being decommissioned in 1923. After spending seven years in reserve, she was used as a barracks ship in the 1930s. In 1940, during World War II, she was converted into a floating anti-aircraft battery and used to defend the port of Wilhelmshaven. She was scuttled by her crew in the final days of the war and was later raised and broken up between 1948 and 1949.

== Design ==
Following the construction of the unprotected cruisers of the Bussard class and the aviso Hela for the German Kaiserliche Marine (Imperial Navy), the Construction Department of the Reichsmarineamt (Imperial Navy Office) prepared a design for a new small cruiser that combined the best attributes of both types of vessels. The designers had to design a small cruiser with armor protection that had an optimal combination of speed, armament, and stability necessary for fleet operations, along with the endurance to operate on foreign stations in the German colonial empire. The resulting Gazelle design provided the basis for all of the light cruisers built by the German fleet to the last official designs prepared in 1914. After the first seven ships had been built or were under construction, the Construction Department improved the design slightly, strengthening the armor on the conning tower and increasing the beam, which allowed more space for coal storage, and thus a longer cruising radius. These changes were applied to the last three members of the class: Arcona, Frauenlob, and Undine.

Plan, profile, and cross-section of the Gazelle class

Arcona was 105 meters (344 ft 6 in) long overall and had a beam of 12.4 m (40 ft 8 in) and a draft of 4.99 m (16 ft 4 in) forward. She displaced 2,706 t (2,663 long tons) normally and up to 3,180 t (3,130 long tons) at full combat load. The ship had a minimal superstructure, which consisted of a small conning tower and bridge structure. Her hull had a raised forecastle and quarterdeck, along with a pronounced ram bow. She was fitted with two pole masts. She had a crew of 14 officers and 256 enlisted men.

Her propulsion system consisted of two triple-expansion steam engines manufactured by AG Weser, driving a pair of screw propellers. The engines were powered by eight coal-fired Marine-type water-tube boilers that were vented through a pair of funnels. They were designed to give 8,000 metric horsepower (7,900 ihp), for a top speed of 21.5 knots (39.8 km/h; 24.7 mph). Arcona carried 700 t (690 long tons; 770 short tons) of coal, which gave her a range of 4,400 nautical miles (8,100 km; 5,100 mi) at 12 knots (22 km/h; 14 mph).

The ship was armed with ten 10.5 cm (4.1 in) SK L/40 guns in single pivot mounts. Two were placed side by side forward on the forecastle; six were located on the broadside in sponsons; and two were placed side by side aft. The guns could engage targets out to 12,200 m (13,300 yd). They were supplied with 1,500 rounds of ammunition, for 150 shells per gun. She was also equipped with two 45 cm (17.7 in) torpedo tubes with five torpedoes. They were submerged in the hull on the broadside.

The ship was protected by an armored deck that was 20 to 25 mm (0.79 to 0.98 in) thick. The deck sloped downward at the sides of the ship to provide a measure of protection against incoming fire. The conning tower had 80 mm (3.1 in) thick sides, and the guns were protected by 50 mm (2 in) thick gun shields.

== Service history ==
=== Kaiserliche Marine ===
Arcona at her launching ceremony, 22 April 1902

Arcona was ordered under the contract name "H", (Note: German warships were ordered under provisional names. Additions to the fleet were given a single letter; ships intended to replace older or lost vessels were ordered as "Ersatz (name of the ship to be replaced)".) and was laid down at the AG Weser shipyard in Bremen in 1901. She was launched on 22 April 1902, and at her launching ceremony, Prince Friedrich Karl of Hesse gave a speech and his wife, Princess Margaret of Prussia, christened the ship. Afterward, fitting-out work commenced and the completed ship was commissioned into the fleet on 12 May 1903 for sea trials under the command of Korvettenkapitän (KK–Corvette Captain) Karl Zimmermann. Initial testing lasted for two months and on 18 July she was assigned to the fleet's Reconnaissance Unit. She joined the fleet for its summer training cruise to Norway that year, after which she took part in the annual fleet maneuvers held in August and September. The ship's training activities for the year ended with a winter cruise with the fleet, which had been re-designated as the Active Battlefleet on 22 September.

Arcona spent the years 1904–1906 in a similar if uneventful routine, her time primarily occupied with unit and fleet maneuvers and training cruises. She was present for a naval review held for the visit of King Edward VII of Britain in June 1904, after which she and the fleet made visits to Britain, the Netherlands, and Norway for its summer training cruise. During the voyage, Arcona stopped in Aberdeen, Scotland to pick up mail for the fleet. In September, KK Hubert von Rebeur-Paschwitz replaced Zimmermann as the ship's captain. The 1905 summer cruise went to Sweden, and Arcona made port calls in Kungsbacka and Södertälje. The rest of the year passed uneventfully, and in September, KK Herwarth Schmidt von Schwind took command of the vessel.

She also participated in the 1906 summer cruise, which went to Norwegian waters that year. The fleet maneuvers, which had immediately followed the cruise, concluded with a naval review on 13 September for Grossadmiral (Grand Admiral) Hans von Koester, who was retiring at the end of the year. Arcona took part in exercises with the Reconnaissance Unit from 21 to 28 March 1907. On 4 April, she was removed from the Active Battlefleet; her crew was reduced, being transferred to man the new cruiser Danzig, which was to take Arcona's place in the reconnaissance unit.

==== Deployment to East Asia ====
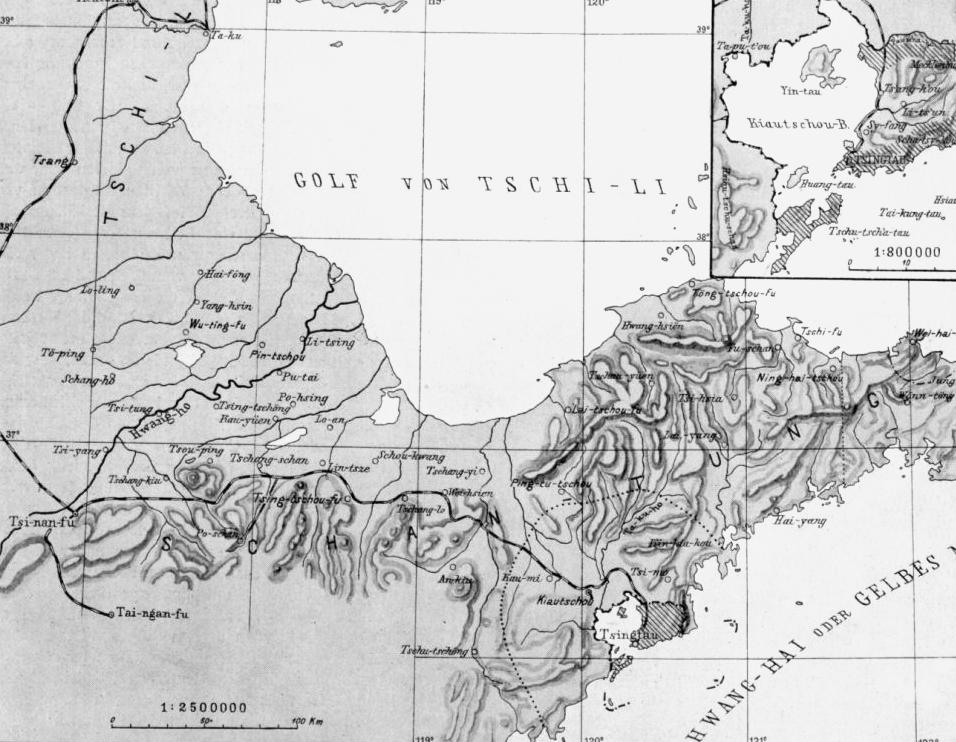
German 1912 map of the Shandong Peninsula showing the Jiaozhou Bay Leased Territory

The ship was then modernized at the Kaiserliche Werft (Imperial Shipyard) in Wilhelmshaven for service overseas. She also received a coat of white paint, as was common for German ships on overseas stations at the time. With the work completed on 14 August, Arcona received a new crew and a new captain—KK Horst von Hippel—and she got underway for East Asia on 27 August. After passing through the Suez Canal, she reached Singapore on 23 October and joined the East Asia Squadron, which was at that time commanded by Konteradmiral (Rear Admiral) Carl von Coerper aboard his flagship, the armored cruiser Fürst Bismarck. Arcona then left Singapore for Hong Kong and then Amoy, remaining in Chinese waters to the end of March 1908. During this period, she steamed from the German Jiaozhou Bay Leased Territory to assist the British steamer SS Chingpin that had run aground further south on the Shandong Peninsula. Attempts to pull the merchant ship free failed.

Arcona next went to visit Japan in April before returning to the East Asia Squadron's main base at Qingdao in Jiaozhou Bay, where she took part in training exercises with the rest of the squadron. She won the Schiesspreis (Shooting Prize) for the East Asia Squadron, an award Kaiser Wilhelm II gave to every major unit every year. She thereafter cruised in Chinese and Japanese waters for much of the rest of 1908. On 8 December, she began a training cruise through the Celebes Sea, arriving back in Qingdao on 22 February 1909. She departed the next day to visit Apia in German Samoa, arriving there on 22 March. The local population had begun to revolt against German rule and Arcona was used to help suppress the unrest, along with the light cruiser Leipzig, which at that time had Coerper aboard, and the gunboat Jaguar. After the warships bombarded the restive villages on the island, the attacks stopped and on 6 May, Arcona left for Suva in British Fiji in company with the squadron collier SS Titania. The ships carried rebels who had been taken prisoner who were to be exiled from Samoa; from Suva, they steamed to Matupi Harbor in Neu-Pommern and then to Saipan in the Marianas Islands, where they disembarked the prisoners. The ships then steamed to Guam and continuing on to Qingdao, arriving there on 5 June. At that time, KK Hermann Schröder relieved now-Kapitän zur See (KzS—Captain at Sea) Hippel.

The ship remained in Qingdao for the next several months before being sent in early September to represent Germany at celebrations in San Francisco in the United States marking the progress in rebuilding the city after the 1906 earthquake, along with the 140th anniversary of the European discovery of San Francisco Bay. Arcona also made a port call in Honolulu, Hawaii on the way to San Francisco, and later stopped in Seattle, San Pedro, and San Diego on the West Coast of the United States. While on the way back, she stopped in Honolulu again and pulled the British sailing ship Celtic Chief free after the latter had run aground. Arcona arrived in Yokohama, Japan on 24 December, where her crew went ashore to assist in the suppression of a major fire. She thereafter returned to Qingdao, where on 17 January 1910, she received orders to return to Germany. She steamed south to Weh Island in the Dutch East Indies where she met Leipzig; the two ships exchanged commanders. Schröder, by this time having been promoted to the rank of fregattenkapitän (FK—Frigate Captain), transferred to Leipzig and FK Karl Heuser took command of the ship for the voyage home. After passing through the Suez Canal and stopping in Port Said from 4 to 7 March, she met her replacement, the cruiser Nürnberg, and some officers and enlisted men were exchanged there as well. Arcona arrived back in Wilhelmshaven on 24 March and she was decommissioned there on the 30th.

==== Return to Germany and World War I ====
The ship was then taken into the Kaiserliche Werft for an overhaul, during which it was found that the ship's condition was still good. The Reichsmarineamt decided that the ship should be rebuilt into a minelaying cruiser, and so over the course of 1911–1912, she was converted for that purpose. Two of her amidships 10.5 cm guns were removed and two 50 cm (20 in) deck-mounted torpedo tubes were installed, along with provisions to carry 200 naval mines. The latter necessitated cutting down her main deck aft, where the mines would be dropped into the sea. Arcona was recommissioned on 31 October 1912 and was assigned to the Coastal Artillery and Mine Weapons Inspectorate. She was then allocated to the Mine Testing Commission on 29 November, based in Emden, for operations in the German Bight. During this period, she took part in the fleet maneuvers held in August and July 1913.

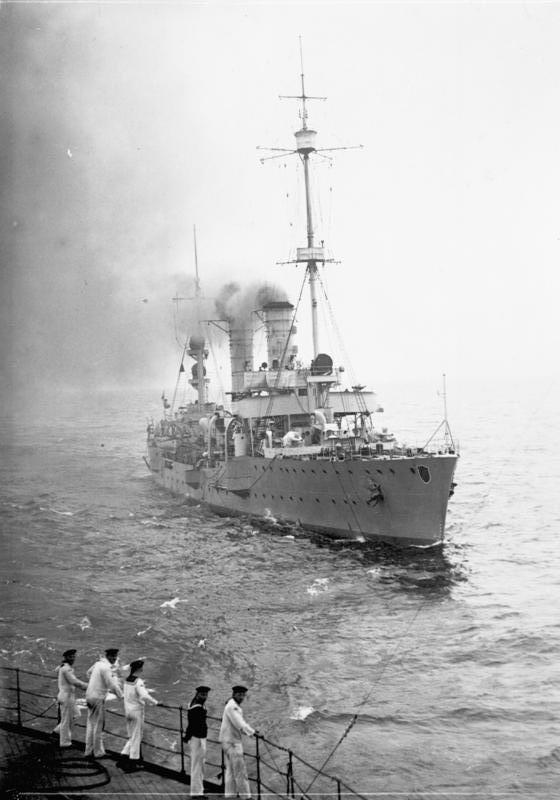
Arcona in Reichsmarine service c. 1921–1923

After the outbreak of World War I in July 1914, Arcona assisted in the laying of a mine barrier off the mouth of the river Ems. She then had the two 10.5 cm guns reinstalled and she became the flotilla leader for the Coastal Defense Division that was based in the Ems in early 1915. In early 1917, she was transferred to the Patrol Flotilla, also based in the Ems, replacing the old coastal defense ship Heimdall as the flotilla leader. During this period, KK Erich Heyden commanded the ship from July to February 1918. In October 1917, she was prepared to lay emergency minefields in the event that the British attempted to attack while substantial elements of the High Seas Fleet were conducting Operation Albion against Russian forces in the Baltic Sea, though no such attack materialized. Throughout the war, she was also used to coordinate wireless communications between ships at sea and stations on land, including the U-boats that waged the U-boat campaign against Allied merchant shipping. She helped to reinforce the defensive mine barriers in the area in April, May, and August 1918.

=== Reichsmarine and Kriegsmarine ===
Following Germany's defeat in the war, much of the German fleet was decommissioned, but there is no record of Arcona having been removed from service. The Treaty of Versailles that ended the war mandated that Germany was responsible for clearing the mines that had been laid in the North Sea during the conflict, and Arcona was selected in early 1919 to serve as a mother ship for the minesweepers that were tasked with clearing the mines; this decision was made after the old pre-dreadnought battleship Preussen proved to be unsuited to the task. Arcona was modified for the role at what was now the Reichsmarine Werft (formerly the Kaiserliche Werft) in Wilhelmshaven; all of her guns except the stern pair were removed, with those being retained to detonate mines that were encountered. After the work was completed, Kapitänleutnant (Captain Lieutenant) Erich Haeker took command of the vessel in May. She was then assigned to support V Minesweeping Flotilla and operated with the unit until February 1920, by which time the work was completed. Arcona was thereafter decommissioned to be rebuilt for fleet service.

Arcona was modernized and rearmed, which included the reconstruction of her bow into a clipper-style prow that improved seakeeping. On 25 May 1921, she was recommissioned and assigned to the Marinestation der Nordsee (North Sea Naval Station), at that time commanded by KAdm Konrad Mommsen. Her first commander after returning to fleet service was FK Friedrich Hermann. Arcona visited Arendal and Sandefjord in Norway in August and then she steamed to Frederikshavn, Denmark, where a monument to the sailors who had died in the Battle of Jutland during the war. The ship was used as an auxiliary icebreaker in February 1922 in the western Baltic Sea and the Kattegat, and in the Gulf of Riga in March. While in the gulf, she was damaged by the sea ice and had to be relieved by the battleship Hessen so she could return to port for repairs. In mid-1922, she visited Balestrand, Norway, and in 1923, she steamed to Turku, Finland and Karlskrona, Sweden. In July of that year, KzS Walter Gladisch relieved Hermann as the ship's commander. On 1 December 1923, Arcona was decommissioned, her place in the fleet being taken by her sister ship Amazone.

The ship remained in reserve for the next seven years, before being struck from the naval register on 15 January 1930. She was then used as a barracks ship for ships' crews in Wilhelmshaven, later being moved to Swinemünde in 1936 and then to Kiel in 1938, by which time the Reichsmarine had been renamed as the Kriegsmarine (War Navy). She remained there after the outbreak of World War II in September 1939. In May 1940, Arcona was converted into a floating anti-aircraft battery in Swinemünde, where she was stationed initially. Her armament now consisted of one 10.5 cm SK C/32 gun, four 10.5 cm SK C/33 guns, two 3.7 cm SK C/30 guns, and four 2 cm guns. She was later moved to Wilhelmshaven, where she was assigned to Naval Anti-Aircraft Group 233, and she was transferred to Brunsbüttel later in the war. In closing days of the war in Europe, her crew scuttled the ship to prevent her from being captured, on 3 May 1945.

Following Germany's surrender, the British Royal Navy took control of the naval installation at Brunsbüttel on 7 May. Arcona was among the warships that were seized, including four U-boats and the badly damaged destroyer Z31. Their German crews unloaded ammunition and removed weapons from the ships under British supervision. She was subsequently broken up for scrap in 1948–1949.
