= Charles Henry Bromedge Caldwell =

US Navy officer in the American Civil War

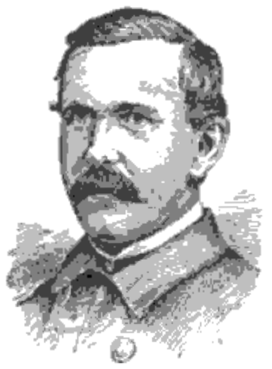
- Born: February 24, 1823; Hingham, Massachusetts
- Died: November 30, 1877 (aged 54); Waltham, Massachusetts
- Military career
- Allegiance: United States
- Branch: Navy
- Rank: Commodore
- Commands: Glaucus
- Conflicts: American Civil War

Charles Henry Bromedge Caldwell (1823–1877) was a United States Navy officer during the American Civil War.

== Career ==
Charles Henry Bromedge Caldwell was born in Hingham, Massachusetts, on February 24, 1823. He entered the navy as midshipman February 27, 1838, and became lieutenant September 4, 1852.

Lt. Caldwell was appointed Inspector of the 2nd Lighthouse District, based in Boston, in 1854. He was transferred to the sloop-of-war USS Vandalia in October 1857.

He commanded the USS Vandalia in the US Navy's second Fiji expedition, an 1859 punitive expedition against Waya Island warriors who had cannibalized two American traders. In 1862, he commanded the gun-boat Itasca, of the western gulf blockading squadron, and took part in the bombardment of Forts Jackson and St. Philip. On the night of April 20, his gun-boat, with the Pinola, was sent on an expedition under the command of Fleet-Capt. Bell, to make a passage for the fleet through the chain obstructions near the forts. Lieut. Caldwell and his party boarded one of the hulks that held the chains, and succeeded in detaching the latter, in spite of the heavy fire to which they were subjected. The Itasca was then swept on shore by the current, in full sight of the forts, and it was half an hour before she was afloat again. She was unable to pass the forts with the rest of the fleet, owing to a shot that penetrated her boiler. Lieut. Caldwell was in the action at Grand Gulf, June 9, 1862, and was promoted to commander on July 16.

He commanded the iron-clad Essex, of the Mississippi squadron in 1862–63, and took part in the operations at Port Hudson, from March to July 1863, in command of the Essex and the mortar flotilla.

He commanded the Glaucus of the North Atlantic blockading squadron from 1863 till 1864, and the R. R. Cuyler, of the same squadron, from 1864 till 1865. He became captain, December 12, 1867, chief of staff of the North Atlantic fleet in 1870, and commodore on June 14, 1874.

He died on November 30, 1877.
