= 1855 Fiji expedition =

1855 American research expedition

- Part of the Fiji expeditions
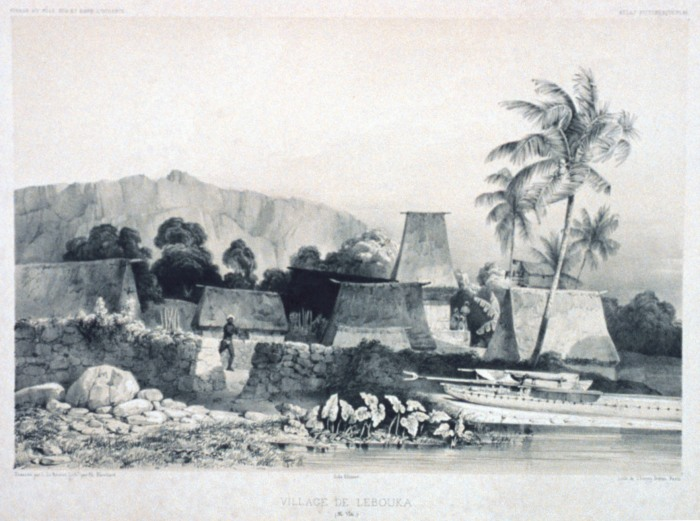
- Lautoka on Viti Levu in 1842.
Date	October 1855
Location	Lautoka, Viti Levu, Fiji 17°37′27″S 177°27′10″E
Result	US military victory: Fijian villages destroyed; US punitive action left satisfied

Belligerents
United States	Kingdom of Fiji

Commanders and leaders
Edward Boutwell	Seru Cakobau

Strength
1 frigate; landing party of U.S. Marines and sailors	Unknown

Casualties and losses
1 killed 2 wounded	Unknown

In October 1855, the United States Navy sent a warship to Fiji during the civil war on the islands. They demanded compensation from Seru Epenisa Cakobau, the Vunivalu of Bau and self-proclaimed Tui Viti (King of Fiji), in response to the alleged arson attacks on the American commercial agent in Lautoka, Viti Levu.

== Expedition ==
The initial incident that led to the American expedition was the burning in 1849 of the house owned by agent John Brown Williams when it was hit by cannon fire. A subsequent incident happened the same year as the expedition when, again, fire was to interrupt Williams's duties. Another accidental fire on Nukulau destroyed his store, and some Fijians looted it. John Adams, under Commander Edward B. Boutwell, was sent to monitor the unrest in October, and her crew landed multiple times to protect American interests. When Commander Boutwell heard of the incidents involving William's house and store, he demanded US$5,000 in compensation from King Cakobau. This initial claim was supplemented by further claims totalling $45,000. He gave the natives a deadline and threatened them with a landing party of marines and sailors to capture the king in the island's village if they failed to pay. Fijian warriors put up some resistance, one American service man was killed, and two were wounded. Ultimately the Adams's men were successful in routing a contingent of natives from Lautoka, but Cakobau and the survivors escaped capture.

Cakobau's claim to be King of Fiji was by no means universally recognised by his fellow-chiefs who jealously guarded the independence of their fiefdoms. If he acknowledged the debt, he did not have sufficient funds to pay it, yet if he disclaimed it by saying that it fell under the jurisdiction of another chief, he would jeopardize his claim to the kingship, which he wanted foreign powers to recognise. He decided to bide his time, hoping that the Americans were only bluffing.

"Believing that the natives had been taught a lesson to be remembered, and conditions having settled to normal, the Commander took his departure on November 4th."

An 1858 Fiji expedition, involving the crew of Vandalia, achieved clearer results, and the debt itself was not resolved until 1862.
