= Japanese occupation government =

Japanese occupation government may refer to:

- Philippine Executive Commission
- Any of the governments set up in China by the Imperial Japanese Army during the Second Sino-Japanese War:
  - Provisional Government of the Republic of China (1937–1940), established in Beijing in 1937
  - Reformed Government of the Republic of China, established in Nanjing in 1938
  - Reorganized National Government of the Republic of China, established in 1940 in Nanjing

== See also ==
- Japanese occupation (disambiguation)
- Governor-General of Karafuto
- Governor-General of Korea
- Governor-General of Kwantung
- Governor-General of Taiwan
- Mengjiang, a Japanese puppet state in Inner Mongolia set up in 1936
- Politics of Manchukuo
