= Japanese colonial empire =

Japanese territorial conquests (1895–1945)

Japanese colonial empire 日本植民地帝國
- 1895–1945
- Flag Imperial Seal
- Anthem: 君が代 ("Kimigayo") 'His Imperial Majesty's Reign'
- The Empire of Japan and areas occupied or influenced by Japan during World War II: Mainland Japan; de jure: Annexes; de facto: Colonies (Korea, Taiwan, Karafuto) / South Seas Mandate (de facto colony after 1933); Puppet states / Protectorates / Occupied territories; Area of Operation Ichi-Go (1944).
- Status: Colonial empire and collection of puppet states
- Capital: Tokyo City (1895–1943); Tokyo (1943–1945)
- Common languages: Japanese Local: Korean (Korea), Taiwanese, Hakka, Formosan languages (Taiwan)
- History
  - Established: 1895
  - Disestablished: 1945
- Currency: Japanese yen, Japanese military yen, Korean yen, Taiwanese yen

Japan and the Greater East Asia Co-Prosperity Sphere at its peak in 1942. Japan and its allies Thailand (in dark red) and Azad Hind occupied territories and client states in lighter red. Korea, Taiwan, and South Sakhalin were integral parts of Japan.

The colonial expansion of the Empire of Japan (sometimes known as the Japanese Empire) in the Western Pacific Ocean and East Asia began in 1895 with Japan's victory over the Chinese Qing dynasty in the First Sino-Japanese War. Subsequent victories over the Russian Empire (Russo-Japanese War of 1904-1905) and the German Empire (World War I) expanded Japanese rule. Taiwan came under Japanese control from 1895, Korea in 1905, Micronesia in 1914, Southern Sakhalin in 1905 (due to the Russo-Japanese War), several concessions in China from 1903 onwards, and the South Manchuria Railway from 1905. In 1931, Japan invaded Manchuria, resulting in the establishment of the puppet state of Manchukuo the following year; thereafter, Japan adopted a policy of founding and supporting puppet states in conquered regions. These conquered territories became the basis for what became known as the Greater East Asia Co-Prosperity Sphere from 1940. (The Co-Prosperity Sphere expanded to include much of China, Indo-China, Malaya, the Philippines, the East Indies, Burma and New Guinea by 1942.)

Including Mainland Japan, colonies, occupied territories, and puppet states, the Empire of Japan at its apex was one of the largest empires in history. The total amount of land under Japanese control reached 8,510,000 km^{2} (3,300,000 sq mi) in 1942. By 1943, it accounted for more than 20% of the world's population at the time, with 463 million people in its occupied regions and territories.

After the Allies defeated Japan in 1945, colonial control from Tokyo over the far-flung territories ended. The extent of Japanese governance was restricted to the core Japanese lands (Japanese: naichi) (excepting Karafuto Prefecture, which the Soviet Union occupied in 1945 and annexed as South Sakhalin Oblast); the Nanpō and Ryūkyū Islands were returned to Japan by the United States in 1968 and 1972 respectively.

The territorial expansion of the Japanese colonial empire was marked by aggression towards other nations, with the Japanese committing numerous atrocities and war crimes, killing millions.

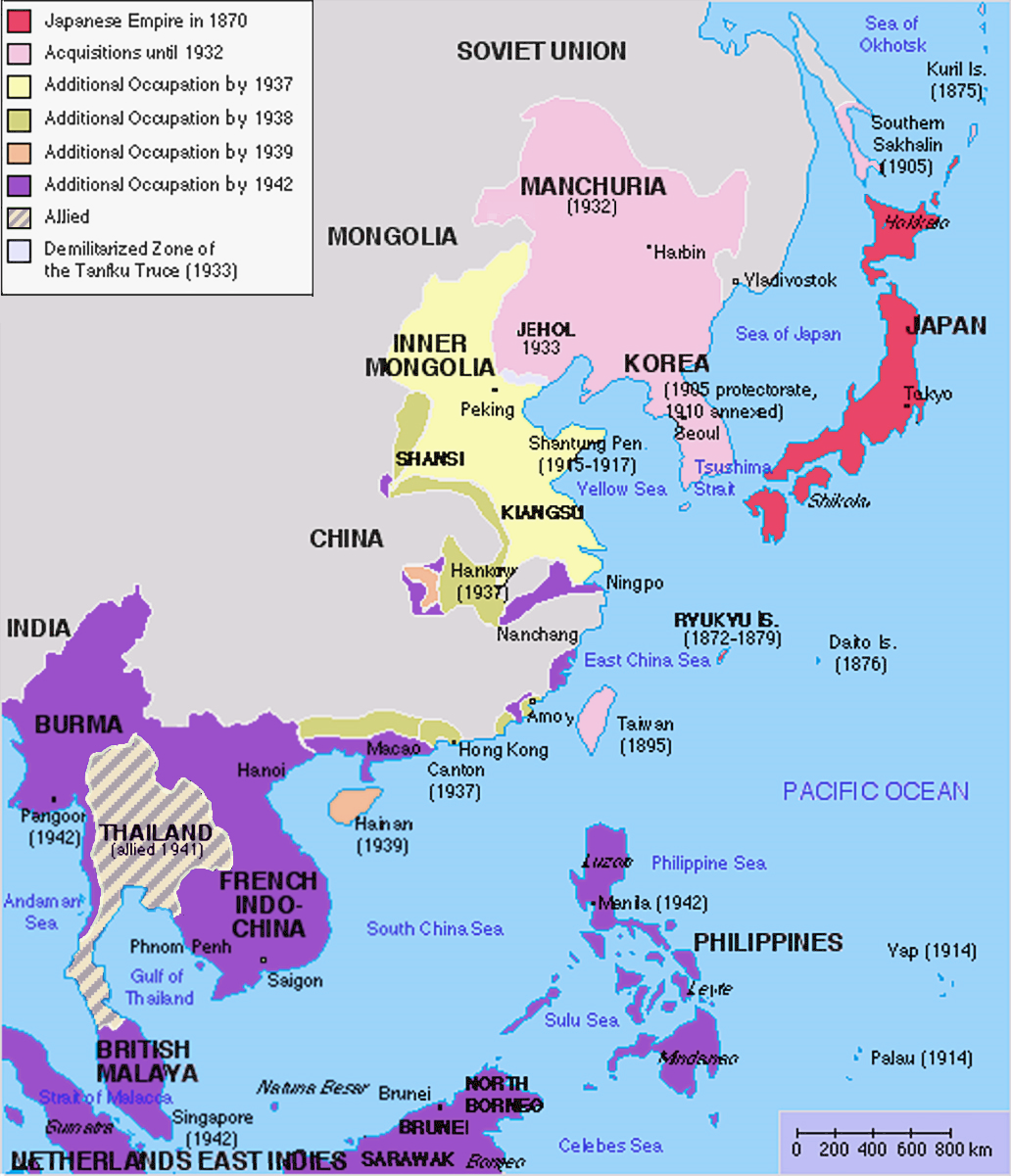
Maximum extent of the Empire of Japan

== Pre-1895 ==
The first overseas territories that Japan acquired were the islands of its surrounding seas. During the early Meiji era, the Japanese Empire established control over Hokkaido, Bonin Islands, Ryukyu, and Kuril Islands; it also strengthened control of the naichi.

== Acquisition of colonies ==
At the start of the twentieth century the rate of population increase in Japan was seen as a potential problem for the Japanese government, and colonial expansion into Korea and Manchuria was seen as a possible solution.

=== Taiwan ===
Between 1895 and 1945, Taiwan, including the Penghu Islands, was a colony of the Empire of Japan; following the defeat of Qing China in the First Sino-Japanese War, it ceded Taiwan to Japan under the terms of the Treaty of Shimonoseki. The short-lived Republic of Formosa resistance movement was quickly suppressed by the Japanese military. The fall of Tainan ended organized resistance to Japanese occupation and inaugurated five decades of Japanese rule.

Since Taiwan was Japan's first overseas colony, the central and colonial governments turned their efforts into making the island a "model colony". These resulted in the modernization of the island's economy, infrastructure, industry, public works, and forced assimilation.

In 1945, after the defeat of the Empire of Japan in World War II, Taiwan placed under the control of the Republic of China with the signing of the Japanese Instrument of Surrender. The experience of Japanese rule, Kuomintang rule, and the February 28 Incident of 1947 continues to affect issues such as Retrocession Day, national and ethnic identity, and the Taiwan independence movement.

=== Korea ===
In the late 19th and early 20th centuries, various Western countries competed for influence, trade, and territory in East Asia, and Japan sought to join these modern colonial powers. The newly modernized Meiji government of Japan turned to Korea, then in the sphere of influence of China's Qing dynasty. The Japanese government initially sought to separate Korea from Qing and make Korea a Japanese satellite to further their security and national interests.

In January 1876, Japan employed gunboat diplomacy to pressure Korea, under the Joseon dynasty, to sign the Japan–Korea Treaty of 1876, which granted extraterritorial rights to Japanese citizens and opened three Korean ports to Japanese trade. The rights granted to Japan under this unequal treaty, were similar to those granted to western powers in Japan following the visit of Commodore Perry. Japanese involvement in Korea increased during the 1890s, a period of political upheaval.

Korea was occupied and declared a Japanese protectorate following the Japan–Korea Treaty of 1905; it was annexed in 1910 through the annexation treaty. Korea was renamed Chōsen and remained a part of the Empire of Japan for 35 years; from August 22, 1910, until August 15, 1945, upon the surrender of Japan in the Pacific War. The 1905 and 1910 treaties were officially declared "null and void" by both Japan and South Korea in 1965.

=== South Sakhalin ===
During the 19th century, Russia and Japan vied for control of Sakhalin Island. Following the Meiji Restoration in 1868, Japanese settlers were sent to southern Sakhalin to exploit its resources. Japan ceded southern Sakhalin to Russia in 1875 in exchange for the Kuril Islands under the Treaty of Saint Petersburg. After achieving victory in the Russo-Japanese War, Japan was ceded southern Sakhalin under the terms of the Treaty of Portsmouth. Japan established its colonial government in 1907, whereupon South Sakhalin was renamed Karafuto Prefecture.

Japanese and Korean migrants to the colony developed the fishing, forestry and mining industries. Taking advantage of the Russian Civil War, the Imperial Japanese Army occupied northern Sakhalin between 1920 and 1925; afterwards Japan retained favorable coal and oil concessions therein until 1944. In 1943, Karafuto was elevated to naichi status.

The Soviet Union invaded and annexed Karafuto at the end of World War II.

=== South Seas Mandate ===
Following the outbreak of World War I in 1914, the Empire of Japan declared war on the German Empire and quickly seized the possessions of the German colonial empire in the Pacific Ocean (the Northern Mariana Islands, the Caroline Islands and the Marshall Islands) with virtually no resistance. After the end of the war the Treaty of Versailles formally recognized the Japanese occupation of former German colonies in Micronesia north of the equator. A League of Nations mandate put them under the Japanese administration known as the Nan'yō Agency or South Seas Agency (南洋廳, Nan'yō Chō) and the post of Governor of the South Seas Mandate was created.

The main significance of the South Seas Mandate to Japan was its strategic location, which dominated the sea lanes across the Pacific Ocean and provided convenient provisioning locations for ships. During the 1930s, the Imperial Japanese Navy began construction of airfields, fortifications, ports, and other military projects on the South Seas Mandate islands, viewing them as "unsinkable aircraft carriers" with a critical role to play in the defense of the Japanese home islands against potential invasion by the United States. The islands became important staging grounds for Japanese air and naval offensives during the Pacific War but were lost to American military action between 1943 and 1945. The League of Nations mandate was formally revoked by the United Nations on July 18, 1947, according to Security Council Resolution 21, making the United States responsible for administration of the islands under the terms of a United Nations trusteeship agreement which established the Trust Territory of the Pacific Islands.

=== Manchuria ===
After emerging victorious against Qing China in the First Sino-Japanese War, Japan was ceded the southern part of the Liaodong Peninsula under the terms of the Treaty of Shimonoseki. Diplomatic pressure from Russia, Germany, and France forced Japan to quickly relinquish the territory, which allowed Russia to lease it from China in 1898. In 1905, Russia was defeated in the Russo-Japanese War; under the terms of the Treaty of Portsmouth, Russia returned the Liaodong Peninsula to Japan, whereupon it was renamed the Kwantung Leased Territory. A governor and an Imperial Japanese Army garrison were established, the latter becoming the Kwantung Army in 1919.

As a result of Russia's defeat, it also lost influence in Manchuria, which allowed Japan to take its place. In 1906, Japan laid the South Manchuria Railway to Ryojun. Japan temporarily occupied Outer Manchuria in 1918, but returned it to the Soviet Union in 1922. Manchuria came under the control of the Chinese warlord Zhang Zuolin during the warlord period in China. He initially had Japanese backing, but the Kwantung Army found him too independent; he was assassinated in 1928.

The Japanese invasion of Manchuria took place in 1931 following the Mukden Incident, a staged event engineered by Japanese military personnel from the Kwantung Army as a pretext for invasion. The region was subsequently separated from Chinese control and the Japanese-aligned puppet state of Manchukuo was created. The last Emperor of China, Puyi, was installed as head of state in 1932, and two years later he was declared Emperor of Manchukuo. The city of Changchun was renamed Xinjing and became the capital of Manchukuo. An imperial palace was specially built for the emperor. He was, however, nothing more than a figurehead and real authority rested in the hands of the Japanese military officials. The Manchu ministers all served as front-men for their Japanese vice-ministers, who made all decisions. Anti-Japanese Volunteer Armies were organized by the Chinese in Manchuria and the pacification of Manchukuo required a war lasting several years.

During the 1930s the Japanese colonized Manchukuo. With Japanese investment and rich natural resources, the economy of Manchukuo experienced rapid economic growth. Manchukuo's industrial system became one of the most advanced, making it one of the industrial powerhouses in the region. Manchukuo's steel production exceeded Japan's in the late 1930s. The Japanese Army initially sponsored a policy of forced industrialization modeled after the Five Year Plan in the Soviet Union but subsequently private capital was used in a very strongly state-directed economy. There was progress in the area's social systems and many Manchurian cities were modernized. Manchukuo issued banknotes and postal stamps, and several independent banks were founded. The Chinese Eastern Railway was bought from the Soviet Union in 1935. Traditional lands were taken and redistributed to Japanese farmers with local farmers relocated and forced into collective farming units over smaller areas of land.

During this period Manchukuo was used as a base from which to invade China. In the summer of 1939, a border dispute between Manchukuo and the Mongolian People's Republic resulted in the Battle of Khalkhin Gol. During this battle, a combined Soviet Army and Mongolian force defeated the Japanese Kwantung Army (Kantōgun) supported by limited Manchukuoan forces. The Soviet Union declared war on Japan on 8 August 1945 under the agreement at the Yalta Conference and invaded Manchukuo from the north through Outer Manchuria and Mongolia. This was called the Manchurian Strategic Offensive Operation. The Army of Manchukuo was defeated and the Emperor was captured by Soviet forces. Most of the 1.5 million Japanese who had been left in Manchukuo at the end of World War II were ultimately sent back to their homeland in 1946–1948 by U.S. Navy ships in the Japanese repatriation from Huludao.

== World War II ==
Territory	Japanese name	Date	Population est.(1943)	Notes
Japan	Naichi (內地)	1868-1945	72,000,000	Present-day Japan, South Sakhalin, Kuril, and Ryukyu Islands
Karafuto/South Sakhalin	Karafuto-chō (樺太廳)	1905-1943	406,000	Ceded by the Russian Empire to Japan
Korea	Chōsen (朝鮮)	1910-1945	25,500,000	
Taiwan/Formosa	Taiwan (臺灣)	1895-1945	6,586,000	Ceded by Qing China to Japan
Mainland China	Shina (支那)	1931–1945	200,000,000 (est.)	Manchukuo 50 million (1940), Rehe, Kwantung Leased Territory, Jiangsu, Shanghai, Shandong, Hebei, Beijing, Tianjin, plus parts of : Guangdong, Guangxi, Hubei, Hunan, Fujian, Guizhou, Inner Mongolia
Hong Kong	Honkon (香港)	December 25, 1941 – August 15, 1945	1,400,000	Hong Kong
East Asia (subtotal)	Higashi ajia (東亞細亞) or Tō-a (東亞)	–	306,792,000	
Vietnam	An'nan (安南)	September 1940 – August 1945	22,122,000	As French Indochina
Cambodia	Kambojia (カンボジア)	August 1941 – August 1945	3,100,000	As French Indochina, Japanese occupation of Cambodia
Laos	Raosu (ラオス)	September 1940 – August 1945	1,400,000	As French Indochina, Japanese occupation of Laos
Thailand	Tai (泰/タイ)	December 8, 1941 – August 15, 1945	16,216,000	Independent state, but allied with Japan
Malaysia	Maraya (マラヤ) or Marē (マレー), Kita Boruneo (北ボルネオ)	December 8, 1941 – September 2, 1945 (Malaya), December 1941 – September 1945 (Sarawak, Brunei, Labuan, North Borneo)	4,938,000 plus 39,000 (Brunei)	As Malaya, British Borneo, Brunei
Philippines	Firipin (比律賓/フィリピン) or Hitō (比島)	1942 - 1945	17,419,000	Philippines
Dutch East Indies	Higashi indo (東印度)	1942 –1945	72,146,000	As Dutch East Indies and West Sumatra
Singapore	Shōnan-tō (昭南島)	February 15, 1942 – September 12, 1945	795,000	Singapore
Burma	Biruma (ビルマ)	1942–1945	16,800,000	Burma
East Timor	Higashi chimōru (東チモール)	February 19, 1942 – September 11, 1945	450,000	Portuguese Timor
Southeast Asia (subtotal)	Tō-nan ajia (東南亞細亞)	–	155,452,000	
Manipur	Manipurū (マニプール)	October 21, 1943 – August 18, 1945	525,000	Azad Hind (also independent but Japanese-allied)
South Asia (subtotal)	Minami ajia (南亞細亞)	-	525,000	
New Guinea	Nyūginea (ニューギニア)	December 1941 – 1945	1,400,000	As Papua and New Guinea
Guam	Ōmiya Island (大宮島)	December 10, 1941 – August 10, 1944		from Guam
South Seas Mandate	Nan'yō guntō (南洋群島)	1919–1945	129,000	from German Empire
Nauru	Nauru (ナウル)	August 26, 1942 – September 13, 1945	3,000	from United Kingdom, Australia and New Zealand
Wake Island	Ōtori Island (大鳥島)	December 23, 1941 – September 4, 1945	nil	United States
Kiribati	Kiribasu (キリバス)	December 1941 – January 22, 1944	28,000	from the Gilbert Islands
Pacific Islands (subtotal)	–	–	1,433,000	
Total population	–	–	464,202,000	

Disclaimer: Not all areas were considered part of the Empire of Japan, but within its sphere of influence, included separately for demographic purposes. Sources: POPULSTAT Asia Oceania

Other islands occupied by Japan during World War II:

- Andaman Islands (India) – March 29, 1942 – September 9, 1945
- Christmas Island (Australia) – March 1942 – October 1945
- Attu and Kiska (Alaska, United States) – June 3, 1942 – August 15, 1943

=== Areas attacked but not conquered ===
- Kohima (India)
- Dornod (Khalkhin Gol, Mongolia)
- Midway Atoll (United States)

=== Raided without immediate intent of occupation ===
- Air raids
  - Pearl Harbor (Hawai'i, United States)
  - Colombo and Trincomalee (Sri Lanka)
  - Kolkata (India)
  - Chittagong (Bangladesh)
  - Air raids on Australia, including:
    - Broome (Western Australia, Australia)
    - Darwin (Northern Territory, Australia)
    - Townsville (Queensland, Australia)
  - Dutch Harbor (Alaska, United States)
  - Lookout Air Raids (Oregon, United States)
- Naval bombardment by submarine
  - British Columbia (Canada)
  - Santa Barbara (California, United States)
  - Fort Stevens (Oregon, United States)
  - Newcastle (New South Wales, Australia)
  - Gregory (Western Australia, Australia)
- Midget sub attack
  - Sydney (New South Wales, Australia)
  - Diego Suarez (Madagascar)

== Administration ==
A shortage of Japanese administrators led to the establishment of colonial puppet states and the promotion of indigenous elites in the territories which came under Japanese control in the 1940s. Japan created relationships with local nationalists and local leaders, who helped Japan in administration of its occupied territories by supporting policing and military operations. This allowed Japanese authorities to maintain control despite having limited manpower while promoting the Greater East Asia Co-Prosperity Sphere.

== Economic development ==
=== In Korea ===
According to Atul Kohli, the David K.E. Bruce Professor of International Affairs and Professor of Politics and International Affairs at Princeton, "the Japanese made extensive use of state power for their own economic development and then used the same state power to pry open and transform Korea in a relatively short period of time". Japan was "decisive in altering both the nature of the Korean state and the relationship of this state to various social classes." How the Japanese centralized bureaucratic style of government was transferred to Korea; how they developed Korean human capital by a considerable expansion of education; how the Japanese invested heavily in infrastructure. Kohli concludes that:

"the highly cohesive and disciplining state that the Japanese helped to construct in colonial Korea turned out to be an efficacious economic actor. The state utilized its bureaucratic capacities to undertake numerous economic tasks: collecting more taxes, building infrastructure, and undertaking production directly. More important, this highly purposive state made increasing production one of its priorities and incorporated property-owning classes into production-oriented alliances".

This sprawling bureaucratic state continued in Korea's postcolonial era — post-World War II and after the Korean War of 1950 to 1953. Japan's early colonial industrialisation of Korea also made it easier for Koreans to rebuild after the Korean War, because there was no need to begin industrialisation ab initio. Examining Korea's policies and achievements in the 1960s and 1970s, Kohli states that during this period the country was firmly heading towards "cohesive-capitalist development, mainly by re-creating an efficacious but brutal state that intervened extensively in the economy". South Korean economic development was not market-driven — rather the "state intervened heavily to promote exports, using both market and non-market tools to achieve its goals".

== See also ==
- List of territories acquired by the Empire of Japan
- Japanese occupation
- Boxer Rebellion (1899–1901)
- Reorganized National Government of the Republic of China (1940–1945)
- Japanese occupation of Indonesia (1942–1945)
- Caroline Islands
- Japanese occupation of Cambodia
- Thailand in World War II
- Greater Germanic Reich
- Italian imperialism under fascism

== Bibliography ==
- " Fallacies in the Allied Nations' Historical Perception as Observed by a British Journalist " by Henry Scott Stokes
- Chen, C. Peter. "Japan's Surrender". World War II Database. Lava Development, LLC.
- Duus, Peter; Hall, John Whitney (1989). The Cambridge History of Japan: The twentieth century, Cambridge University Press. ISBN 978-0-521-22357-7
- Duus, Peter (1995). The Abacus and the Sword: The Japanese Penetration of Korea, 1895–1910. Berkeley: University of California Press
- Hunter, Janet (1984). Concise dictionary of modern Japanese history, University of California Press: 1984, ISBN 978-0-520-04557-6
- Kohli, Atul (2004). State-Directed Development: Political Power and Industrialization in the Global Periphery. Cambridge: Cambridge University Press. ISBN 978-0-521-54525-9.
- Maiolo, Joseph (2010). Cry Havoc How the Arms Race Drove the World to War, 1931–1941, New York: Basic Books.
- Myers, Ramon Hawley; Peattie, Mark R. (1984). The Japanese Colonial Empire, 1895-1945. Princeton: Princeton University Press. ISBN 0-521-22352-0.
- Ohnuki-Tierney, Emiko (1981). Illness and Healing Among the Sakhalin Ainu: A Symbolic Interpretation. CUP Archive. ISBN 978-0-521-23636-2
- Paichadze, Svetlana; Seaton, Philip A. (2015). Voices from the Shifting Russo-Japanese Border: Karafuto / Sakhalin. Routledge Studies in the Modern History of Asia. Routledge. ISBN 978-1-317-61889-8
- Pastreich, Emanuel (2003). "Sovereignty, Wealth, Culture, and Technology: Mainland China and Taiwan Grapple with the Parameters of "Nation State" in the 21st Century". Program in Arms Control, Disarmament, and International Security, University of Illinois at Urbana-Champaign.
- Peattie, Mark R. (1988). "Chapter 5 - The Japanese Colonial Empire 1895-1945". The Cambridge History of Japan Vol. 6. Cambridge: Cambridge University Press. ISBN 0-521-22352-0.
- Peattie, Mark (1992). Nan'Yo: The Rise and Fall of the Japanese in Micronesia, 1885-1945. University of Hawaii Press. ISBN 0-8248-1480-0.
- Plowright, John (2007). The causes, course and outcomes of World War Two. Histories and Controversies. Basingstoke: Palgrave Macmillan. ISBN 978-0-333-79345-9
- Ponsonby-Fane, Richard (1962). Sovereign and Subject. Ponsonby Memorial Society.
- Spiller, Roger J. (2007) An instinct for war: scenes from the battlefields of history, Harvard University Press. ISBN 978-0-674-01941-6
- Wurm, Stephen A.; Mühlhäusler, Peter; Tryon, Darrell T., ed. (1996). Atlas of Languages of Intercultural Communication in the Pacific, Asia, and the Americas. Trends in Linguistics. Documentation. Volume 13. Walter de Gruyter.
- Yamamuro, Shin·ichi (2006). Manchuria under Japanese domination. Translated by Fogel, Joshua A. Philadelphia, Pa.: University of Pennsylvania
- Ziomek, Kirsten L. Lost Histories: Recovering the Lives of Japan's Colonial Peoples (Harvard University Asia Center, 2019) 406 pp. online review
