= Matupi Harbour =

Bay in East New Britain, Papua New Guinea

Coordinates: 4°14′S 152°12′E

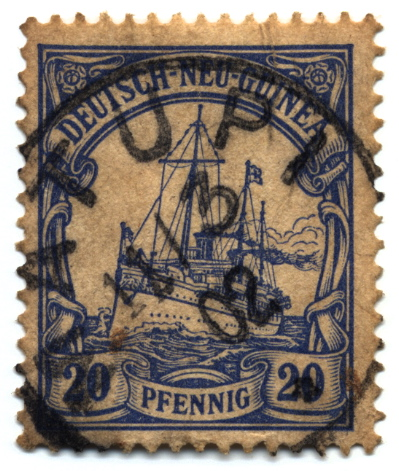
MATUPI cancel in 1902 on a German colony 1901 issue

Matupi Harbour is a harbour near Rabaul in East New Britain province, Papua New Guinea. It is located between Praed Point and Matupi Island. Simpson Harbour is to the west and Blanche Bay to the south.
