= Japanese occupation of German colonial possessions =

Operation during World War I

- Part of the Asian and Pacific theatre of World War I
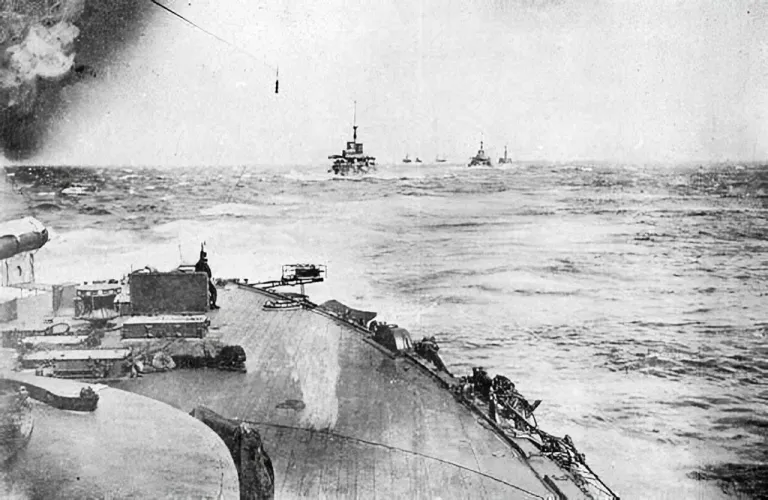
- Japanese Warships traveling the ocean.
Date	29 September – 21 October 1914
Location	German New Guinea, Mariana Islands, Marshall Islands, Palau Islands, Caroline Islands
Result	Japanese victory
Territorial changes	Japanese occupation of Mariana Islands, Marshall Islands, Palau Islands, Caroline Islands

Belligerents
Japan	German Empire; German New Guinea

Commanders and leaders
(Empire of Japan) Matsumura Tatsuo; (Empire of Japan) Yamaya Tanin	(German New Guinea) Albert Hahl

Strength
2 Naval detachments "Nankenshitai"	German Officers, Administrators, Polizeiteuppe, and Local Auxilaries.; Outdated and Ceremonial Cannons.; 1 survey ship; Several other minor ships

Japan entered World War I in 1914 with the strategic objective of expanding its influence in the Pacific region by seizing German-controlled colonies. As a member of the Anglo-Japanese Alliance, Japan aligned itself with France, Great Britain, Russia, and the United States. In October 1914, the Japanese sent vessels to occupy German-held territories in the Pacific. This included the Mariana Islands, Marshall Islands, Palau, and Caroline Islands. These islands were of significant strategic value and would play important roles during World War II as military bases and logistical hubs.

Map of German Pacific Colonies in Micronesia that were taken by the Japanese.

== Background and motivation ==
Following the Meiji Restoration and first war with China, Japan’s consolidation of nationalistic ideals led them to seek imperialism outside of their borders as the natural progression of Meiji ideals. However, the Japanese were not ignorant to the growing Western influence in Asia. Japan and Britain forged the Anglo-Japanese Alliance of 1902, an anti-Russian strategic alliance that protected British and Japanese influence in the area, as both nations realized they required alliances rather than isolation to further their interests. To Japan, this allowed them to act more aggressively with the backing of a European power. This treaty would be renewed up until 1914, which allowed the Japanese an easy entrance into World War I on the side of the Allies via invocation of the alliance.

Along with the alliance with Britain, Japan was experiencing political strife in its time of peace which motivated their entrance into the war. Both sides, between the militaristic, bureaucratic elite, and the rising political parties built towards the larger civilian populace, agreed that The Great War was an opportunity to continue to support the legacy of Meiji Japan’s nationalistic and empire building ideals. Following Japan’s success in growing its influence in China, Japan was motivated to join World War I on the side of the Allies to expand their influence in Asia as a whole at the behest of many Japanese politicians like Yamagata Aritomo.

Seizing the opportunity to expand its imperial reach, Japan declared war on Germany on August 23, 1914. Shortly thereafter, on August 27, Japanese forces launched attacks on German colonies in China. The most notable battle being the Siege of Tsingtao which took place in the Shandong Peninsula. Japan's involvement in World War I allowed it to assert its dominance in East Asia and the Pacific, laying down the ground work for its growing imperial ambitions in the decades to follow.

== Actions ==
Japanese aggression

During World War I, Japan, allied with Britain through the Anglo-Japanese Alliance and declared war on Germany in 1914. Japan initially focused on besieging German possessions in China. The most notable of these possessions being the strategic port City of Qingdao. The siege marked the first Anglo-Japanese action that took away German control and sole major Asia-Pacific land battle of World War I. Japan then sent the Imperial Japanese Navy out to the Pacific islands held by the Germans. The British however were annoyed by the Japanese aggression in the Pacific as they told them not to attack them.

German defenses

Germany did not plan on defending the islands, since they did not think that they would be attacked. When the Japanese invaded the islands, German officers, police and locals had minor resistance which did not stop the Japanese invading the islands. One example of resistance was on the Micronesian island of Ponape, where a District Officer, two Polizeitruppe NCOs and 50 Melanesian Polizeitruppe who retreated into the forests. Another example was when on the island of Yap, the HMS Minotaur shelled the island’s radio station, and with the help of two other British cruisers they captured the collier Elsbeth. After the shelling, the crew of the SMS Planet tried scuttling the vessel at the entrance of the harbor attempting to stop Japanese ships from getting in. A third example was when a sergeant on the island of Saipan rebelled against the Japanese marines that were landing by rallying the local police force and confronted them on the beach.

== Japanese Occupation ==
The navy minister told Japanese commanders not to occupy any islands. Tanin Yamaya disobeyed the order and occupied Jaluit Atoll on September 29. The navy ministers told him to reverse the military occupation of the island but changed their mind after seeing that the islands were otherwise unoccupied. The island was later reoccupied on October 3. After that on Oct. 5, Japan would occupy Kosrae. The Japanese then proceeded to occupy the other islands as the United Kingdom didn't react. Ponape in the Caroline's was captured on Oct. 7, although the territory's surrender was delayed a few days due to a small local defence force that hid in the island's interior to mount a resistance. They later realized their situation was hopeless and gave up. The Caroline islands of Yap also fell on October 7 and the only tensions there were the shelling, destruction of the wireless station and the scuttling of the SMS Planet, followed by the occupation of Koror on October 8, Angaur on Oct. 9. Truk Atoll was captured on Oct. 12, Saipan on October 14 while encountering minor resistance, and Rota October, 21st. In less than a month all of German New Guinea's islands were occupied by Japan beside Nauru.

== Aftermath ==
After occupation

After the Japanese had occupied the German islands, they were not faced with any local resistance. The occupation of Japan saw two groups: pro-Japanese sentiment and anti-Japanese sentiment. The pro-Japanese sentiment stemmed from Japan's Japanisation policy towards islanders, which was implemented to assimilate islanders. The anti-Japanese sentiment stemmed from the cruel treatment of the islanders during the Pacific War as they stated their disapproval of the Japanese sending them to fight the Americans due to their status as a Japanese territory. This led to the call for reparations from Japan.

South Seas Mandate

Following the initial Japanese occupation of the islands, a policy of secrecy was adopted. Japan made it plain that it did not welcome the entry of foreign ships into Micronesian waters, even those of its wartime allies. This was known as the South Seas Mandate.
