= Fiji expeditions =

The United States Fiji expeditions include:

- 1840 Fiji expedition
- 1855 Fiji expedition
- 1858 Fiji expedition
