= SMS Planet =

1905-1914 survey ship of the German Empire

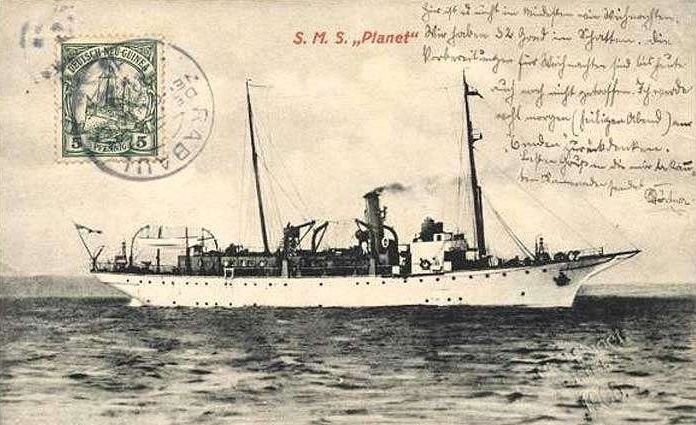
S.M.S. Planet - depicted on a postcard

SMS Planet was a survey ship of the Kaiserliche Marine. Her sister-ship was the SMS Möwe.

== Description ==
Planet was built by AG Weser in Bremen, launched on 2 August 1905 and commissioned on 16 November 1905. The crew of the ship consisted of six officers, four deck officers and 81 petty officers, sailors, stokers, and craftsmen.

== History ==
At the outbreak of World War I the ship was serving in the German North Pacific islands. On 7 October 1914 the crew of Planet scuttled the vessel off the island of Yap to avoid capture by Japanese naval forces under the command of Rear Admiral Tatsuo Matsumura.
