= Simpson Harbour =

- Harbour
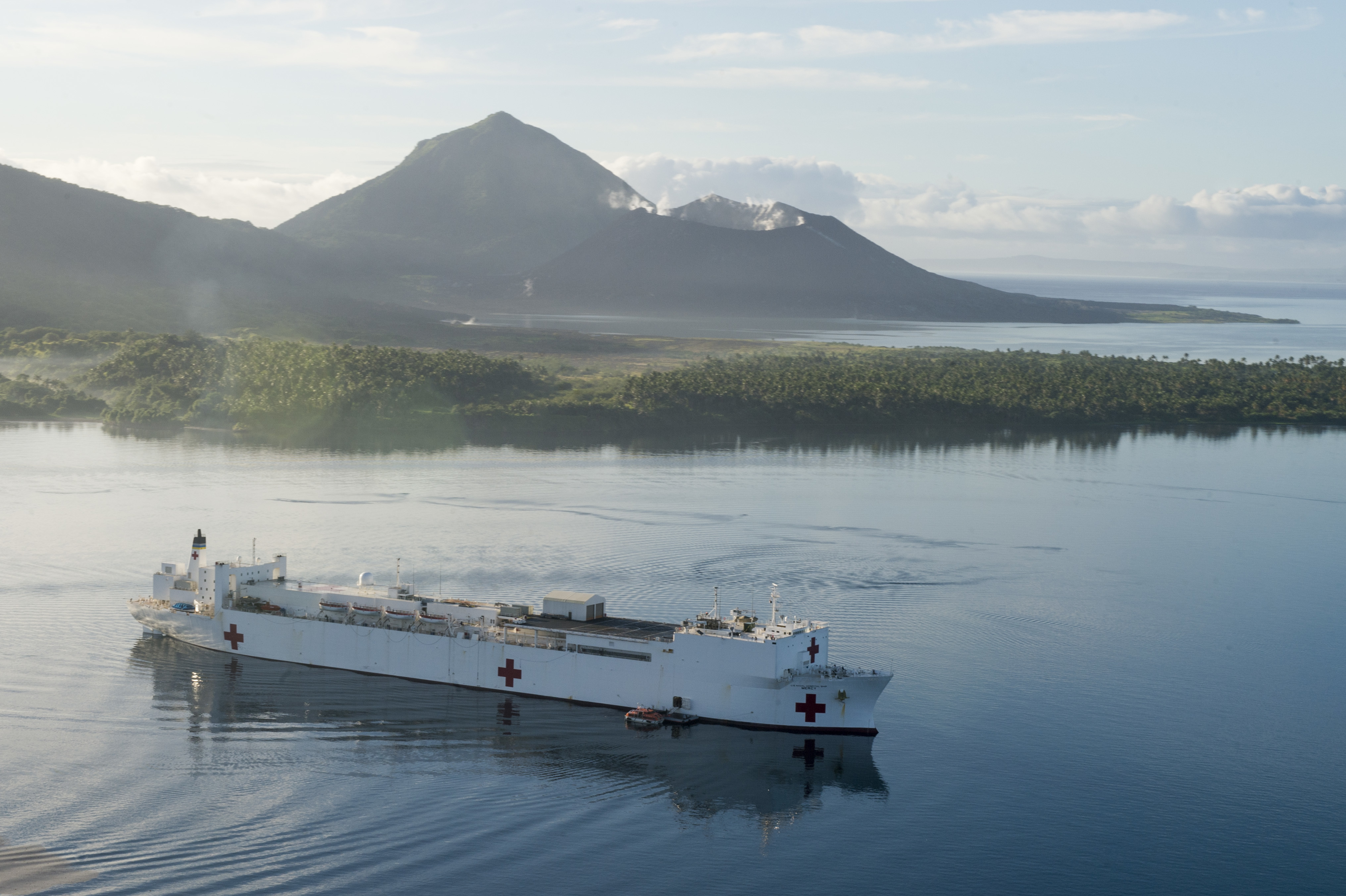
- USNS Mercy at anchor in Simpson Harbour
- Interactive map of Simpson Harbour
- Coordinates: 4°13′S 152°10′E
- Country: Papua New Guinea
- Township: Rabaul
- Named for: Cortland Simpson
- Time zone: UTC+10 (AEST)

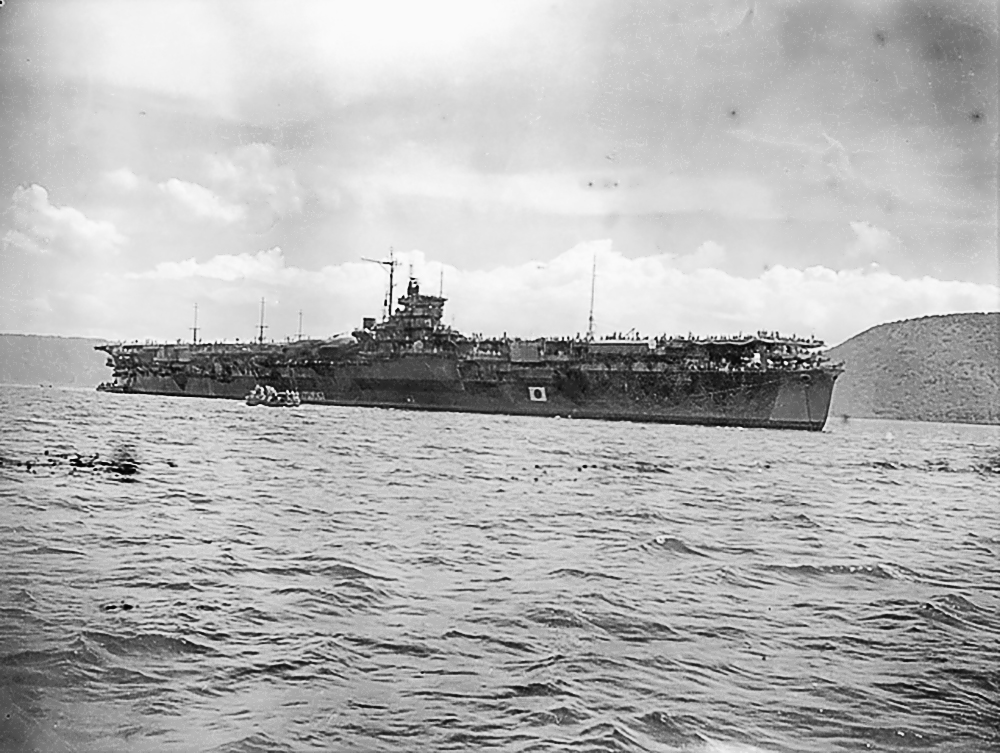
The Japanese aircraft carrier Katsuragi in Simpson Harbor as a repatriation ship, post-war

Simpson Harbour is a sheltered harbour of Blanche Bay, on the Gazelle Peninsula in the extreme north of New Britain. The harbour is named after Captain Cortland Simpson, who surveyed the bay while in command of HMS Blanche in 1872. The former capital city of Rabaul is on its shores.

The harbour is part of a huge flooded caldera, Rabaul caldera. The harbour is ringed by a number of volcanoes.

== History ==
The Australian Naval and Military Expeditionary Force captured Rabaul during World War I after entering Simpson Harbour.

During World War II, the Imperial Japanese utilised the harbour as a major naval base. Approximately 65 Japanese ships were sunk in the harbour by Allied air attacks.

The surrender of the Japanese forces of New Guinea, New Britain, and the Solomon Islands took place on 6 September 1945 in a ceremony aboard the aircraft carrier HMS Glory. Representing the Japanese were General Hitoshi Imamura, Commander Eighth Area Army, and Admiral Jinichi Kusaka, Commander Southeast Area Fleet.

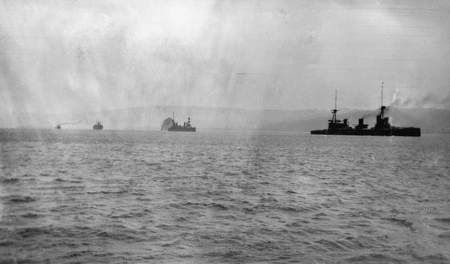
The Australian squadron entering Simpson Harbour, Rabaul, in September 1914

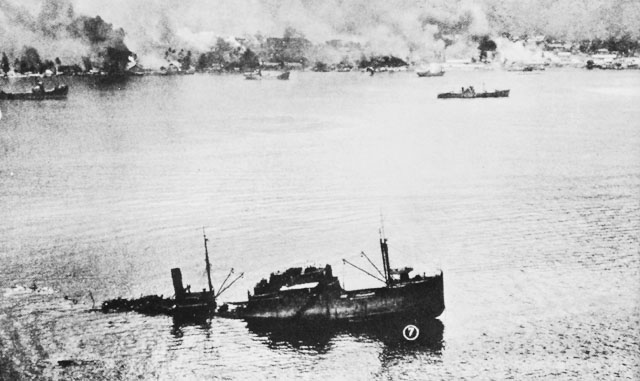
Sunken Japanese transport ships in Simpson Harbour at Rabaul (1943)

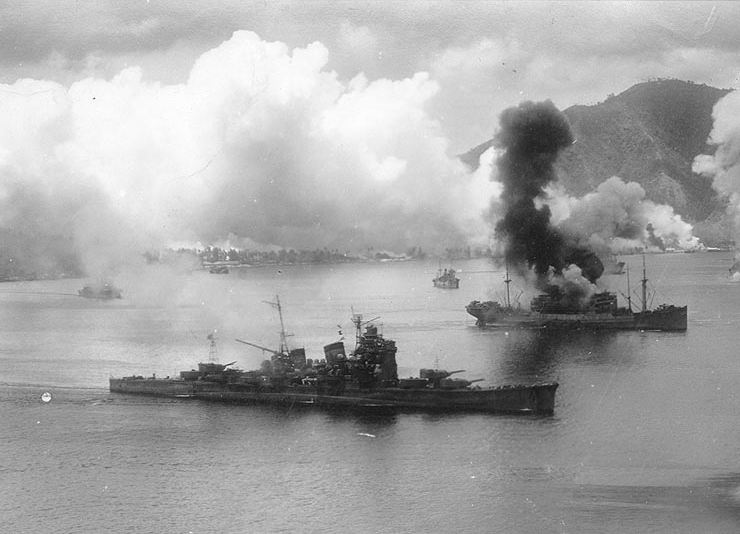
Aircraft of the USAAF attack Japanese ships, 2 November 1943

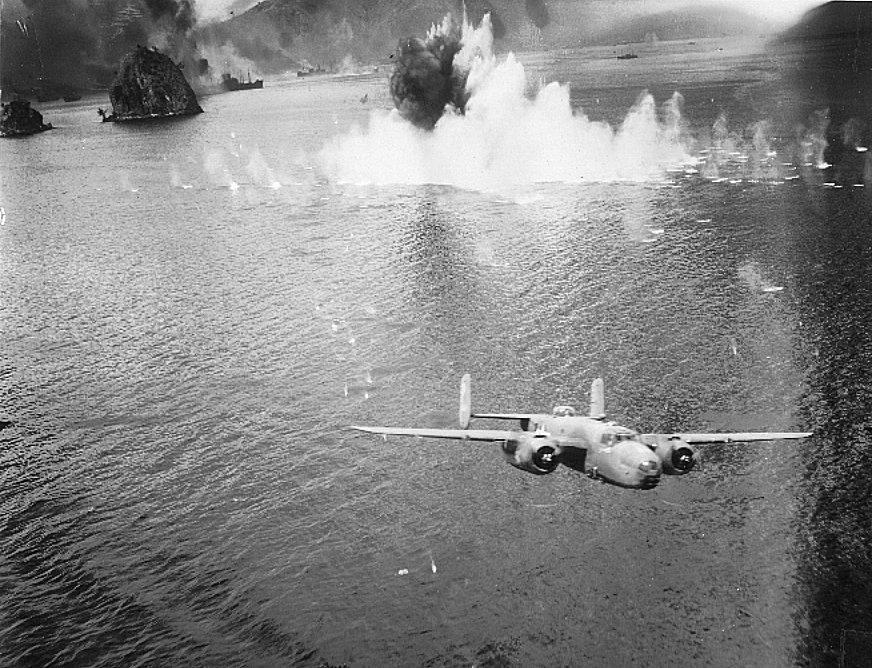
90th Bomb Squadron during the 2 November 1943 attack on Simpson harbor

== See also ==
- Australian Naval and Military Expeditionary Force
- Bombing of Rabaul (1942)
- Bombing of Rabaul (November 1943)
