= SS Titania =

A number of steamships have carried the name Titania.

- SS Titania (1908), a passenger ship in service 1908–16, requisition as HMS Tithonus, torpedoed and sunk in 1918.
- SS Titania (1912), a coaster in service 1939–45

== See also ==
- HMS Titania, a Royal Navy submarine depot ship, 1915–1949
