= HMAS Upolu =

Submarine depot ship operated by the Royal Australian Navy

History
- Name: Upolu (1891–1921); Tung An (1921–1930)
- Owner: Union Steam Ship Company (1891–1903); Lever's Pacific Plantations (1903–1911); Brisbane Milling Company (1911–1915); A B Iffland van Ess (1915–1916); G McBain (1916–1921); Shaw Hsing Steam Ship Company (1921–1930)
- Builder: Fleming & Ferguson, Paisley
- Yard number: 169
- Fate: Sank after collision off Shantung Promontory on 12 August 1930

Australia
- Name: Upolu
- Acquired: 18 August 1914
- Out of service: 9 December 1914
- Fate: Returned to owners

General characteristics
- Tonnage: 1141 gross tonnage
- Length: 220 ft (67 m)
- Beam: 30.1 ft (9.2 m)
- Depth: 18.5 ft (5.6 m)
- Installed power: 139nhp
- Propulsion: quadruple expansion steam engine

HMAS Upolu was a submarine depot ship operated by the Royal Australian Navy (RAN) during World War I. She was built by Fleming & Ferguson, Paisley, Scotland in 1891, for the Union Steam Ship Company. She was requisitioned by the RAN on 18 August 1914 and converted into a submarine depot ship and after a short commission, she was returned to her owners on 9 December 1914. She was sunk in a collision with the Lienhsing off the Shantung Promontory on 12 August 1930.

== RAN Service ==
On 18 August 1914, Upolu was requisitioned by the RAN for use as a submarine depot ship. She participated during the Australian Naval and Military Expeditionary Force occupation of German New Guinea tendering the submarines AE2 and AE1. She returned to Sydney in November 1914 and was returned to her owners on 9 December 1914.

== Fate ==
While transporting coal from Tsingtao to Newshang, she was sunk in a collision with the Lienhsing off the Shantung Promontory on 12 August 1930.
