= 1858 Fiji expedition =

1858 American research expedition

Coordinates: 17.3000°S 177.1333°E

- Part of the Fiji expeditions
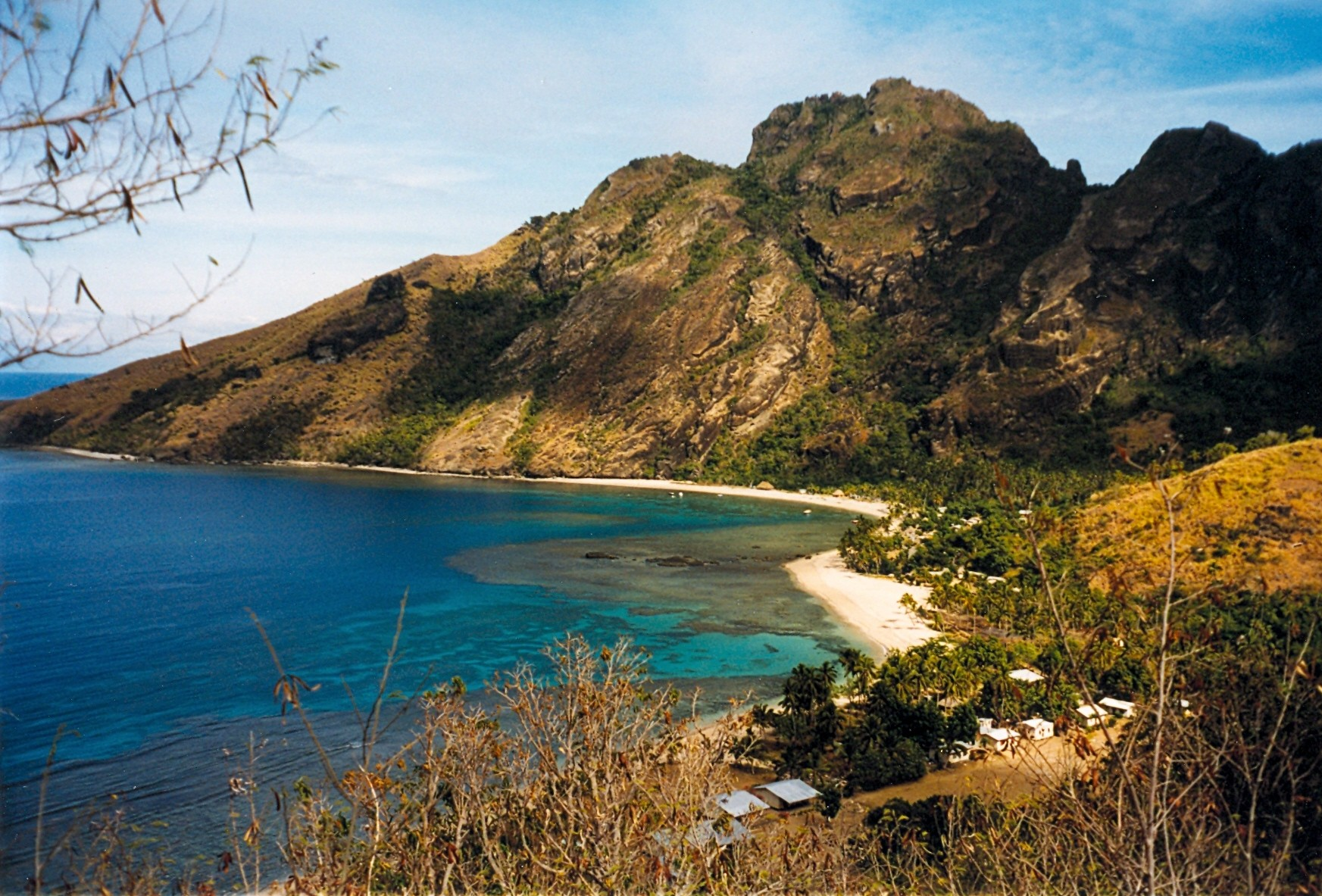
- Yalobi Bay at Waya, Fiji
Date	6–16 October 1858
Location	Waya, Fiji, Pacific Ocean
Result	American victory

Belligerents
United States	Fijians

Commanders and leaders
(United States) Charles Caldwell (United States) John K. Bartlett (United States) Alan Ramsey	Seru Epenisa Cakobau

Strength
Land: 10 marines 40 sailors 1 artillery piece Sea: 1 schooner	~300 warriors

Casualties and losses
6 wounded 1 artillery piece destroyed	14 killed ~36 wounded 115 huts destroyed
- A few friendly Fijians accompanied the expedition as guides.

In 1858, (Note: Given the level of editorial oversight the 2010 Naval History blog post had is unknown, "1859" may be a typo or a confounding with the date of one of its sources, Report of the Secretary of the Navy to Congress, 1859. While two 2021 sources (The Fiji Times and the U.S. Navy and Heritage Command) also say 1859, a 2023 report by the U.S. Congressional Research Service gives 1858, a year supported by a number of older sources. The English-language Wikipedia article had said 1858 until 11 October 2015 (edit permalink) before being changed back [to 1858] nearly a decade later on 2 July 2025 (edit permalink).) the United States Navy launched an operation on the island of Waya in Fiji following the death of two American traders there. The Pacific Squadron executed a punitive expedition against the native warriors of Seru Epenisa Cakobau and defeated them in a pitched battle at the village of Somatti.

== Background ==
In mid-1858, two American citizens on Waya were killed and cannibalized by the natives. When word of the incident reached the American consulate at Ovalau, the Pacific Squadron sent the Vandalia, and the sloop-of-war arrived on 2 October 1858. The Vandalia's draft was not shallow enough to reach Waya, so Commander Sinclair chartered the schooner Mechanic and placed her under the command of veteran Lieutenant Charles Caldwell. A force of 10 marines, forty sailors and a 12-pounder howitzer were mustered for the landing on Waya.

A few Fijian guides and three American merchant sailors also participated. One was Captain Josiah Knowles of the Wild Wave, a clipper ship wrecked off Oeno Island. Knowles and 40 others were marooned on the island until being rescued by Vandalia and taken to Fiji.

== Expedition ==
The expedition left Ovalau on 6 October 1858 and sailed west around the northern end of the main island of Viti Levu to Waya. During their passage to the island, Lieutenant Caldwell's men heard many stories from towns and villages about the warriors of Waya. The Wayan chiefs responsible for the deaths of the two American traders also sent a letter: "Do you suppose we have killed the two white men for nothing? No, we killed them and we have eaten them. We are great warriors, and we delight in war". Caldwell later wrote, "...and woe to the members of any strange tribe that falls into their hands... to be clubbed to death and eaten is the only alternative for the captive. It is not a matter of surprise that the tribes along our route learned with feelings of satisfaction the nature of our expedition".

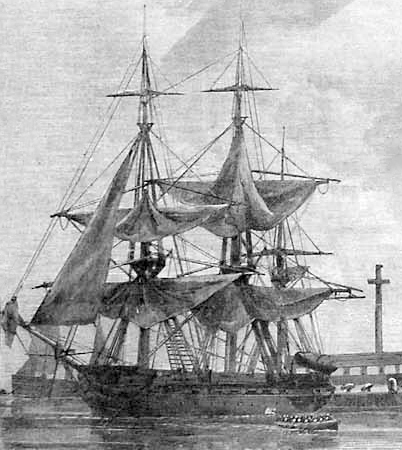
Vandalia during the American Civil War.

At 03:00 on 9 October, the Americans made a landing and marched inland toward the village of Somatti over tropical and mountainous terrain. While climbing through the mountains, the 12-pounder was destroyed and left behind when it fell 2,300 feet (700 m) down the side of a hill as the expedition tried to pull it up.

The column reached Somatti in daytime, and over 300 native warriors were in front of the village for defense, clothed in white robes and armed with clubs, rocks, spears, bows, and some muskets. The Americans had swords and carbine rifles. Lieutenant Caldwell ordered a flanking maneuver on the left side of the mass of warriors. Routed, the natives dispersed themselves amongst the town or fled into the jungle. After, Master's Mate John K. Bartlett, who led a group of sailors, sang "Red, White, and Blue" and let out three cheers before charging and capturing the village.

The crew of the 12-pounder, with no gun to fire, took charge of burning the village, and over 115 huts were destroyed. Marines under Lieutenant Alan Ramsey, providing a rearguard for the sailors, repulsed a final Wayan attack from the jungle after they had regrouped. In all fourteen warriors, including the two chiefs, were counted dead after a fierce half-hour battle. At least 36 others were wounded. Two marines survived their wounds by musketry, two sailors were hurt badly by rocks, one other marine was hit in the leg with an arrow, and a sailor from Wild Wave was hurt as well.

After the battle the Americans took until 16 October to return to the coast where the Mechanic was waiting. They stopped at friendly Fijian fishing villages and spread the news of their victory. Caldwell noted that two ramrods and one bayonet were lost during the march, and a large amount of ammunition was used in battle. The lieutenant received much credit for the operation, considered one of the most impressive military campaigns launched by the United States in the South Pacific during the nineteenth century.

== See also ==
- Wilkes Expedition
- Sumatran Expeditions
- Korean Expedition
- Formosan Expedition
- Nukapu Expedition
