= Australian occupation of Nauru =

Occupation of Nauru

- Part of the Asian and Pacific theatre of World War I
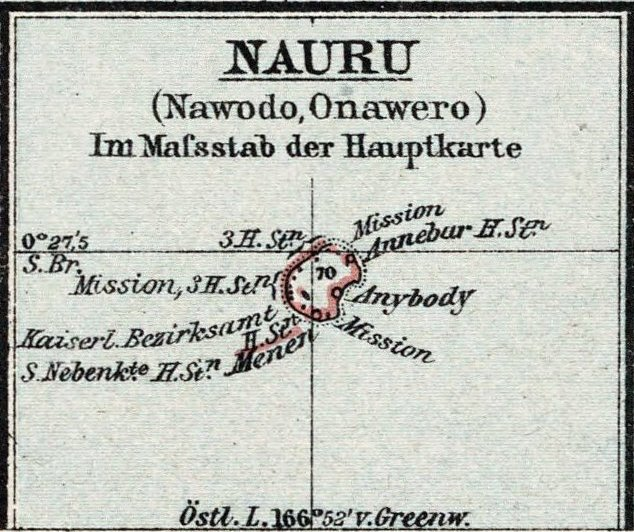
- Map of Nauru created by Germany (1897)
| Date | 9 September – 6 November 1914 |
| Location | Nauru |
| Result | Australian victory |

Belligerents
| Allied Powers: Australia | Central Powers; Germany: German New Guinea |

Commanders and leaders
| George Patey | Wilhelm Wostrack |

Units involved
| HMAS Melbourne | Colonial administrators and local police |

Casualties and losses
| None | Administrators captured |

In September 1914 Australia occupied Nauru, then part of German New Guinea, following the start of World War I. This was part of a larger plan by Japan, the United Kingdom, Australia, and New Zealand to intercept Germany's East Asia Squadron before they could return to Germany. The island continued to be occupied by Australia until the end of the war.

== Background ==
Following the Nauruan Civil War, in 1888 Nauru was annexed into the German Colony of Papua New Guinea. Following the outbreak of World War I, Japan, the United Kingdom, Australia, and New Zealand occupied the German Colonies of Kiautschou Bay Leased Territory, German Samoa, and German New Guinea.

== Australian landing ==
Following the occupation of German Samoa, HMAS Melbourne left New Zealand-occupied Samoa and set off for Nauru, arriving on 9 September 1914. The Australian occupation led to the destruction of the wireless stations and the capture of the island's colonial governor. The island was then fully occupied by 6 November and continued to be occupied by Australia until the end of the war.

== Aftermath ==
Following the war, Nauru became a mandate of Australia as decided by the League of Nations. The United Kingdom and New Zealand became the island's co-trustees.

== Sources ==
- Storr, C. (2020). "From Protectorate to Colony to Mandate, 1920". International Status in the Shadow of Empire: Nauru and the Histories of International Law. Cambridge Studies in International and Comparative Law. Cambridge University Press. ISBN 978-1-108-49850-0.
