= USS Vandalia (1828) =

Gunboat of the United States Navy

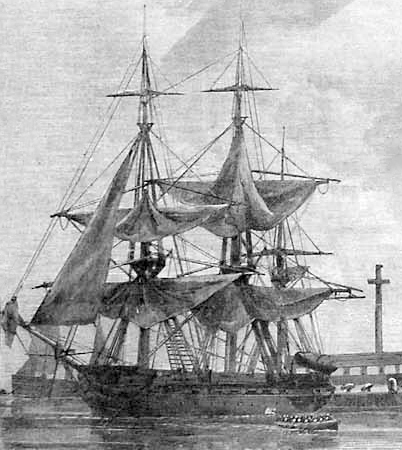
- USS Vandalia in 1861

History

United States
- Name: USS Vandalia
- Builder: Philadelphia Navy Yard
- Laid down: 1825
- Launched: 1828
- Commissioned: 6 November 1828
- Decommissioned: 4 February 1863
- Fate: Broken up, between 1870 and 1872

General characteristics
- Type: Sloop-of-war
- Tonnage: 614
- Length: 127 ft 4 in (38.81 m)
- Beam: 34 ft 6 in (10.52 m)
- Draft: 16 ft 6 in (5.03 m)
- Propulsion: Sail
- Complement: 150 officers and enlisted
- Armament: 4 × 8 in (200 mm) shell guns; 16 × 32-pounder guns

The first Vandalia was an 18-gun sloop-of-war in the United States Navy during the Second Seminole War and the American Civil War. She was named for the city of Vandalia, Illinois.

== Service history ==
Vandalia was laid down at the Philadelphia Navy Yard in 1825; launched in 1828; and commissioned on 6 November of that year, Commander John Gallagher in command.

=== Brazil Squadron, 1828–1831 ===
Vandalia left Philadelphia on 16 December 1828, bound for duty with the Brazil Squadron off the eastern seaboard of South America. She remained off the coasts of Brazil and Argentina for the next three years, during a period of political unrest on the continent of South America. She returned to Norfolk, Virginia, on 18 December 1831; was decommissioned the next day.

=== West Indies Squadron, 1832–1839 ===
Vandalia remained inactive until 4 October 1832 when she was recommissioned for service with the West Indies Squadron. Vandalia again put into Norfolk in August 1834 and was decommissioned there on the 24th for major repairs. Recommissioned on the last day of the year, she joined the West Indies Squadron in January 1835 and served with that organization into the summer of 1838; cooperating with land forces in Florida during the Second Seminole War; and helping to suppress piracy and the slave trade. After almost three months laid up undergoing repairs from 30 August to 24 November, the ship was reactivated and returned to duty for a year in the Caribbean. Nearing five years in its current service, and now being unseaworthy, it returned to Hampton Roads, Virginia, where her commissioning pennant was again hauled down at Norfolk on 23 November 1839.

=== Home Squadron, 1842–1845 ===
Following more than two years on the stocks, the ship was returned to commission on 3 February 1842, joined the newly created Home Squadron in 1842, and performed routine patrol and reconnaissance duties at scattered points as far north as Newfoundland and as far south as the mouth of the Amazon River. During a visit to Haiti in the early spring of 1845, an epidemic of yellow fever broke out in the ship. She returned immediately to Norfolk, was decommissioned on 30 April, and was laid up.

=== Pacific Squadron, 1849–1852 ===
During the sloop's period in ordinary which lasted until 1849, she was lengthened by 13 feet in 1848. The renovated Vandalia was re-commissioned on 9 August 1849 and joined the Pacific Squadron on 5 September 1849 as that organization was expanding to service the territory which the United States had recently acquired on the Pacific coast. She made several visits to the Hawaiian Islands in 1851 before returning to the New York Navy Yard on 6 October 1852 and going out of commission again on the 14th.

=== East Indies Squadron, 1853–1856 ===
Vandalia's rest ended on 14 February 1853, and the ship soon joined Commodore Matthew C. Perry's East India Squadron. She was present as part of Perry's forces during his second visit to Japan on 13 February 1854, which resulted in the Treaty of Kanagawa opening Japanese ports to American ships. In 1855 she helped to protect American interests in China during the Taiping Rebellion. Vandalia was decommissioned at the Portsmouth Navy Yard on 30 September 1856.

=== Pacific Squadron, 1857–1860 ===
Vandalia was recommissioned on 11 November 1857 for duty with the Pacific Squadron. In 1859, the warship rescued survivors of the American clipper ship Wild Wave, wrecked off Oeno Island in the Pitcairn Islands, and conducted an expedition against natives at Waya Island, Fiji, following the murder of two American citizens. Vandalia returned to the New York Navy Yard early in 1860 and was decommissioned on 6 January of that year. Commodore Matthew C. Perry, leader of the East Indies Squadron died on 4 March 1858 a year after his return to the U.S. The last known survivor of the Vandalia's crew to have been present at the Taiping Rebellion, and the "opening" of Japan in 1854 was Able Seaman Patrick C. McFadden. A native of Ireland, he died in Canton, Illinois 16 February 1901.

=== Civil War, 1860–1863 ===
Vandalia was recommissioned on 8 November 1860 and assigned to duty with the East Indies Squadron with Captain Samuel P. Lee commanding. With the outbreak of the Civil War in April 1861, Vandalia was called back home and assigned to the South Atlantic Blockading Squadron on 31 May for blockade duty off Charleston and Bull's Bay, South Carolina. There, she captured the schooner Henry Middleton on 21 August and assisted in the capture of the sailing ship Thomas Watson on 15 October. The vessel also participated in the successful amphibious assault upon Roanoke Island, North Carolina, on 7 and 8 November. This victory closed the supply lines to Confederate-held Norfolk Navy Yard and was largely responsible for the evacuation of that vital naval facility six months later. Vandalia put into New York on 24 November to deliver the officers and crew of the wrecked steamer Governor.

Vandalia soon returned to duty with the South Atlantic Blockading Squadron and was deployed off Tybee Roads, Georgia, in December. She remained at Tybee until April 1862, at which time she was ordered to proceed to the blockade at Wassaw Sound, Georgia. The sloop returned to Port Royal, South Carolina, in late June and took up blockade duty off Charleston in July. She served at Port Royal as a guardship in September and was repaired and resupplied there in November. Later that month and in December, she cruised along the outside line of the blockade off Charleston and Port Royal Bay, performing reconnaissance duties as well as giving practical sailing experience to recent Naval Academy graduates. On 29 December, the vessel was ordered north for major structural repairs at New York, having sprung a leak under her magazine.

Vandalia was decommissioned at the New York Navy Yard on 4 February 1863 and then sailed for Portsmouth, New Hampshire, on 17 October for use as a receiving and guard ship. She remained at Portsmouth until broken up there sometime between 1870 and 1872.

== See also ==
- Union Navy
