= George Patey =

Royal Navy Admiral (1859–1935)

Admiral Sir George Patey KCMG KCVO
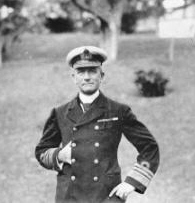
- Vice Admiral Sir George Patey
- Born: 24 February 1859; Montpellier, near Plymouth, United Kingdom
- Died: 5 February 1935 (aged 75)
- Military career
- Allegiance: United Kingdom
- Branch: Royal Navy
- Service years: 1872–1919
- Rank: Admiral
- Commands: North America and West Indies Station (1915–16); HM Australian Fleet (1913–16); 2nd Battlecruiser Squadron (1909–11, 1915); HMS Implacable (1905–07); HMS Venerable (1902–04)
- Conflicts: Anglo-Zulu War; First World War
- Awards: Knight Commander of the Order of St Michael and St George; Knight Commander of the Royal Victorian Order; Order of the Redeemer (Greece); Cross of the Order of the Naval Merit (Spain); Cross of the Order of Military Merit (Spain)

Admiral Sir George Edwin Patey, KCMG, KCVO (24 February 1859 – 5 February 1935) was a senior officer in the Royal Navy.

== Early years ==
Patey was born on 24 February 1859 at Montpellier, near Plymouth, United Kingdom. His father, also named George Edwin Patey, was a Royal Navy officer. Patey entered the Royal Navy as a cadet on 15 January 1872, aged 12.

== Naval career ==
Patey served as a midshipman aboard HMS Shah as part of the British Pacific Squadron under Admiral de Horsey during the Battle of Pacocha, an action in company with the corvette HMS Amethyst on 29 May 1877 with the Peruvian armoured turret ship Huáscar which had been taken over by rebels opposed to the Peruvian Government and, it was feared, could be used to attack British shipping. He was promoted to sub-lieutenant on 21 March 1878, and while upon the voyage home HMS Shah was diverted to South Africa to assist in the Anglo-Zulu War. Patey served in the naval brigade which was formed to fight ashore, for which he received the South Africa Medal.

Promoted to lieutenant on 10 August 1881, he went to gunnery school at HMS Excellent between February 1889 and February 1892. Assigned to naval intelligence, he was promoted to commander on 31 December 1894 and became Assistant Director of Naval Intelligence. Serving upon HMS Barfleur as part of the British Mediterranean Squadron, he participated in the Allied occupation of Candia, Crete on 15 February 1897, and was part of the International Squadron blockading Crete during the Cretan Christian uprising against the rule of the Ottoman Empire there in 1897–1898.

After being promoted to captain on 1 January 1900, he returned in March that year to the Excellent for senior officers' gunnery course. He went on to serve as Assistant Director of Naval Intelligence. As such he was assistant to the Director, Reginald Custance, who asked Patey to join him when he was appointed second in command of the Mediterranean Fleet in November 1902. Patey was therefore appointed in command of the battleship HMS Venerable on 12 November 1902, for her first commission after completion, as second flagship on the Mediterranean Station. In command of the Venerable, he was appointed a Member of the Royal Victorian Order (MVO) by King Edward VII during his visit to Naples on 23 April 1903, and was awarded the Order of the Redeemer from George I, King of Greece the same year. Later he went on to command HMS Implacable between 1905 and 1907. He was awarded the Cross of the Order of the Naval Merit and Cross of the Order of Military Merit from Alfonso XII, King of Spain. On 22 March 1908, he became a Naval Aide-de-camp to King Edward VII.

On 2 January 1909, he was promoted to rear admiral in the British Home Fleet and was commander of the 2nd Battle Squadron until 1911. In 1913, he was loaned from the Royal Navy to be the first Rear Admiral Commanding HM Australian Fleet and was awarded a Knight Commander of the Royal Victorian Order on his flagship HMAS Australia, when King George V visited the Australian Fleet at Spithead on 30 June 1913 to review the fleet and watch them depart for Australia. He was promoted to vice admiral on 21 September 1914.

At the outbreak of First World War, Patey commanded the Australian naval squadron as part of the New Zealand Samoa Expeditionary Force that captured German Samoa and the Australian Naval and Military Expeditionary Force that captured German New Guinea. He sailed with HMAS Australia to join the 2nd Battlecruiser Squadron at Rosyth, Scotland and on 8 February 1915, Australia became the flagship of the squadron. Patey was appointed Commander-in-Chief, North America and West Indies Station from March 1915.

He was appointed Knight Commander of the Order of St Michael and St George on 1 January 1916. On 22 September 1916, he transferred to another ship of the Royal Navy and command of His Majesty's Australian Fleet was transferred to Rear Admiral William Pakenham.

He died on 5 February 1935.

== Notes ==
Military offices
| Preceded by Colin Keppel | Captain of HMS Implacable; 1905–1907 | Succeeded by Mark Kerr |
| New command | Rear Admiral Commanding HM Australian Fleet; 1913–1916 | Succeeded by William Pakenham |
| Vacant Title last held by Sir Day Bosanquet | Commander-in-Chief, North America and West Indies Station; 1915–1916 | Succeeded by Sir Montague Browning |
