= Blanche Bay =

Bay in Papua New Guinea

Coordinates: 4°16′S 152°13′E

Blanche Bay is a bay near Rabaul, New Britain, Papua New Guinea. The bay is named after HMS Blanche, which surveyed the bay under the command of Captain Cortland Simpson in 1872.
