= Spee =

Spee is the family name of:

- Spee (noble family), a German noble family
  - Friedrich Spee (Friedrich Spee von Langenfeld) (1591–1635), German Jesuit and author of Cautio Criminalis
  - Degenhard Bertram von Spee (1681–1736)
  - Ambrosius Franziskus von Spee (1730-1791)
  - Carl-Wilhelm von Spee (1758-1810)
  - Maximilian von Spee (1861–1914), German admiral in the Imperial German Navy
  - Clarissa von Spee, German art historian
- Bibian Mentel (née Spee, 1972–2021), Dutch snowboarder
- Gitte Spee (born 1950), Dutch children's books illustrator
- Just Spee (born 1965), President of the Dutch football association (KNVB)
- Nzante Spee (1953–2005), Cameroonian painter

It may also refer to:

- German cruiser Admiral Graf Spee, scuttled outside the port of Montevideo in 1939
- Spee Club, a coed final club at Harvard University
- Spermidine synthase, an enzyme
