= Carl-Wilhelm von Spee =

German nobleman (1758–1810)

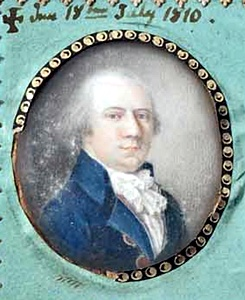
Portrait of Carl Wilhelm von Spee

Carl-Wilhelm Franz-Xaver, Count von Spee (22 May 1758 in Düsseldorf – 18 July 1810 at Castle Heltorf) was a German nobleman from the family of the Counts of Spee and was at the service of Cologne and Kurpfalz-Bavaria.

== Life ==
Carl-Wilhelm Franz-Xaver von Spee entered the service of the Elector of Cologne. There, he became a Privy Councillor and Chief Kitchen Master. At the time of his marriage in 1780, he also held the titles of Palatine-Bavarian Court Chamber Councillor and Chamberlain. In the Duchy of Jülich-Berg, he served as the Chief Equerry.

The count was also interested in botany and established the Dickenbusch Park at his ancestral estate, Schloss Heltorf. He also owned Schloss Ahrenthal, which came from the Hillesheimer estate. In 1806, he acquired the Spee Palace (now the City Museum) in Düsseldorf. In total, he owned nine knightly estates.

In 1807, Spee suffered a stroke and remained partially paralyzed. He died in 1810.

He and his wife were the great-grandparents of Admiral Count Maximilian von Spee, who became known in modern German history and perished in 1914 along with his two sons in the naval battle near the Falkland Islands.

== Ancestry ==
He came from the Rhineland noble family von Spee and was born as the son of Ambrosius Franziskus Count von Spee zu Heltorf und Aldenhoff (1730–1791), Vice President of the Court Chamber of Jülich-Berg, and his wife, Anna Elisabeth Augusta von Hillesheim (1725–1798), the daughter of the Palatine Minister Franz Wilhelm Caspar von Hillesheim (1673–1748). This made the count a grandson of Degenhard Bertram Baron von Spee.

== Marriage and family ==
In 1780, he married Auguste Elisabeth Freiin von Hompesch-Bolheim (1763–1785). She was the daughter of the Palatine and Bavarian Minister of Finance, Franz Karl Joseph Anton von Hompesch zu Bolheim, and the granddaughter of Baron Ludwig Anton von Hacke.

The couple had four children:

- Franz von Spee (1781–1839)
- Wilhelm von Spee (*1782)
- Charlotta von Spee (*1783)
- Elisabeth von Spee (1785–1834), married Maximilian von Vietinghoff
