= Degenhard Bertram von Spee =

German noble

Degenhard Bertram von Spee (July 29, 1681–March 11, 1736) was a German nobleman from the Baron von Spee family and an officer in the service of the Electoral Palatinate.

== Life and career ==
At the age of 22, Degenhard Bertram von Spee entered the military service of the Electoral Palatinate. He served as a colonel of dragoons in the Electoral Palatine Life Guard and commanded a cavalry regiment named after him from 1707 to 1711. During this period, he participated in the War of the Spanish Succession, notably taking part in the Siege of Toulon in 1707 and the Battle of Almenar in 1710, where he was captured.

Spee later rose through the ranks, becoming a Major General and ultimately reaching the rank of Lieutenant General in the Electoral Palatinate army.

=== Political and Personal Life ===
Beyond his military career, Degenhard Bertram von Spee also served as an Electoral Palatine Privy Councilor and held the lordship of Altenhof. In 1714, he leased the Düsseldorfer Hof von Holland for 12 years.

After inheriting Heltorf Castle, he expanded it as the future residence of his family. His widow later lived there with their son, Ambrosius Franziskus von Spee, who, in 1739 at the age of nine, was elevated to the Imperial Count (Reichsgraf) by Emperor Charles VI.

Ambrosius Franziskus von Spee became the great-great-grandfather of Admiral Maximilian von Spee, who gained historical significance in German military history. Maximilian von Spee and his two sons perished in the Battle of the Falkland Islands in 1914 during World War I.

=== Imperial Recognition ===
In the document granting Ambrosius Franziskus von Spee the title of Count (Graf) on May 9, 1739, Emperor Charles VI praised the merits of his father, Degenhard Bertram von Spee.

== Ancestry and family ==
Degenhard Bertram von Spee came from the Rhenish noble family von Spee. He was born as the son of Friedrich Christian von Spee (1626–1695), who served as the Electoral Palatinate's Chamber President and Court Marshal, and his second wife, Anna Elisabeth von Loë (1648–1704), whom he married in 1678. Anna Elisabeth was the daughter of Degenhard Bertram von Loë of Wissen.

His father, Friedrich Christian von Spee, was previously married to Maria von Scheid genannt Weschpfennig, the daughter of Johann Bertram von Scheidt genannt Weschpfennig, the chief court steward of the Duchy of Berg and foster father of the future Elector Palatine, Philipp Wilhelm. This marriage produced only daughters, one of whom, Maria Anna Franziska von Spee († 1725), married Electoral Palatinate Lieutenant General Johann Wilhelm von Efferen († 1724). Through this first marriage, Friedrich Christian von Spee inherited Heltorf Castle in 1662, when Johann Bertram von Scheidt died, which later became the main residence of his descendants.

== Marriage and descendants ==
In 1714, Degenhard Bertram von Spee married Elisabeth Amalie von der Gracht zu Wangen (1694–1761). Among their children was Ambrosius Franziskus von Spee (1730–1791) who was the first Count of Spee and the father of Carl-Wilhelm von Spee, who later married Anna Elisabeth Augusta von Hillesheim (1725–1798), daughter of the Palatinate minister Franz Wilhelm Caspar von Hillesheim (1673–1748).
