= Ambrosius Franziskus von Spee =

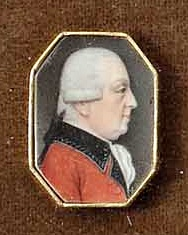
Amrosius Franziskus von Spee (1730-1791), Elector Palatine Chamberlain and Privy Councillor

Ambrosius Franziskus Anton Adam Count von Spee zu Aldenhoff und Heltorf (30 October 1730 in Düsseldorf; † 1 September 1791) was a German nobleman from the family of the Counts of Spee and was in the service of the Duchy of Jülich-Berg, the Electorate of the Palatinate and the Electorate of Palatinate-Bavaria.

== Life ==
Ambrosius Franziskus von Spee was elevated to the rank of Imperial Count by Emperor Charles VI On May 9, 1739, at the age of nine. He entered the service of the Duchy of Jülich-Berg, which belonged to the Electorate of the Palatinate, both of which were incorporated into the state of the Electorate of the Palatinate-Bavaria in 1777.

The nobleman held the offices of Privy Councillor, Chamberlain (from 1752), and Vice President of the Court Chamber of Jülich-Berg. He also served as District Administrator of Kaster and Jüchen.

Count von Spee was a Knight of the Order of the Palatinate Lion.

He had his seat at Heltorf Castle and owned seven other manors; his wife and his son Carl-Wilhelm inherited the possessions of the noble family of Hillesheim, which had died out in the male line in 1785, especially Ahrenthal Castle.

== Ancestry and family ==
Ambrosius came from the Rhenish noble family von Spee and was born as the son of the Electoral Palatinate Lieutenant General Baron Degenhard Bertram von Spee (1681–1736) and his wife Elisabeth Amalie von der Gracht zu Wangen (1694–1761).

In 1756 he married Anna Elisabeth Augusta von Hillesheim (1725–1798) in Mannheim, a daughter of the Palatinate minister Franz Wilhelm Caspar von Hillesheim (1673–1748).

One of their children was Carl-Wilhelm von Spee (1758–1810), who married the daughter of the Electorate of the Palatinate and Bavarian Finance Minister, Franz Karl Joseph Anton von Hompesch zu Bolheim. They became the great-grandparents of Admiral Count Maximilian von Spee, who became famous in modern German history and who died with his two sons in a naval battle near the Falkland Islands in 1914.
