= Spee family =

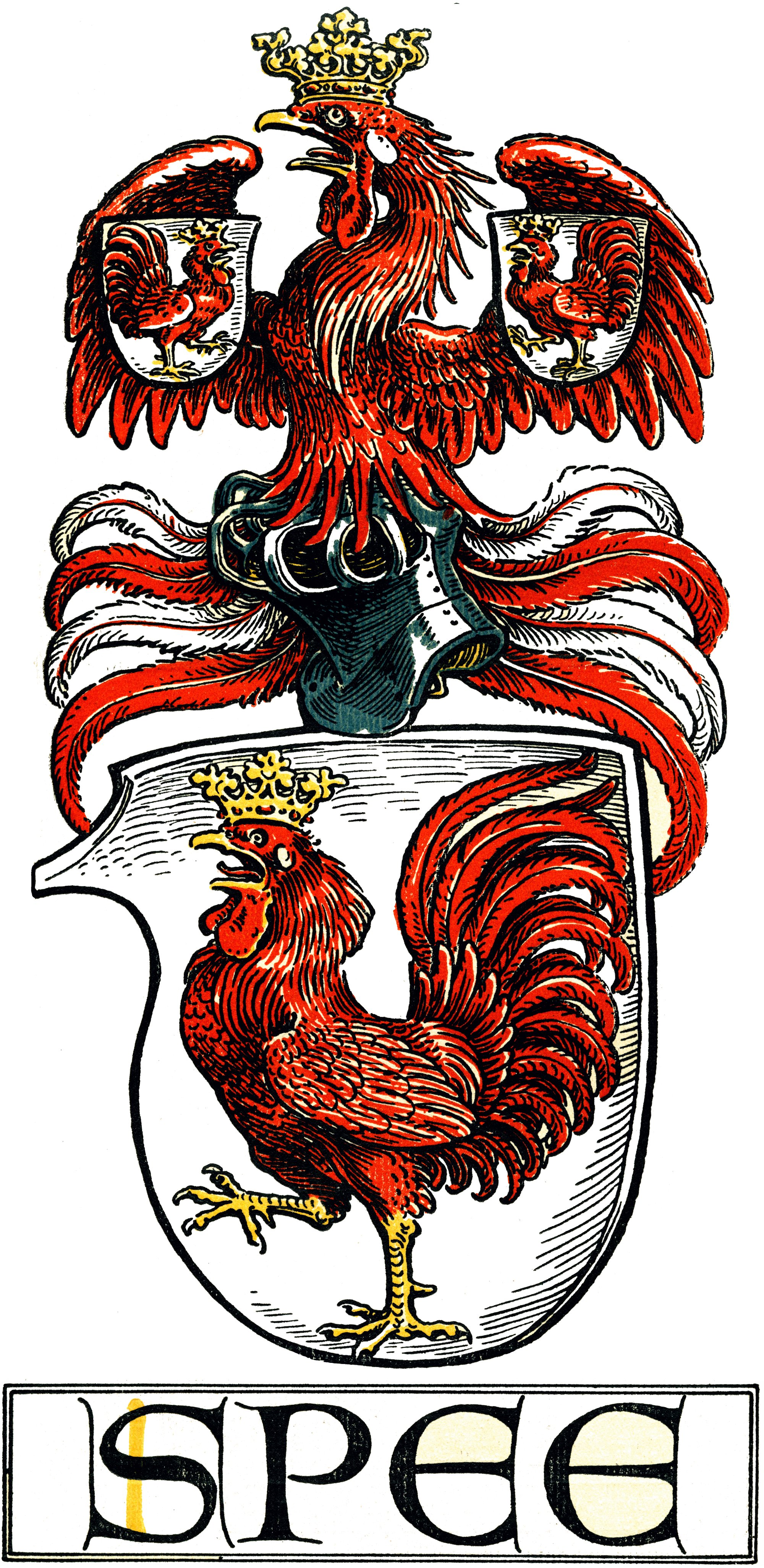
Original coat of arms of the Spee family

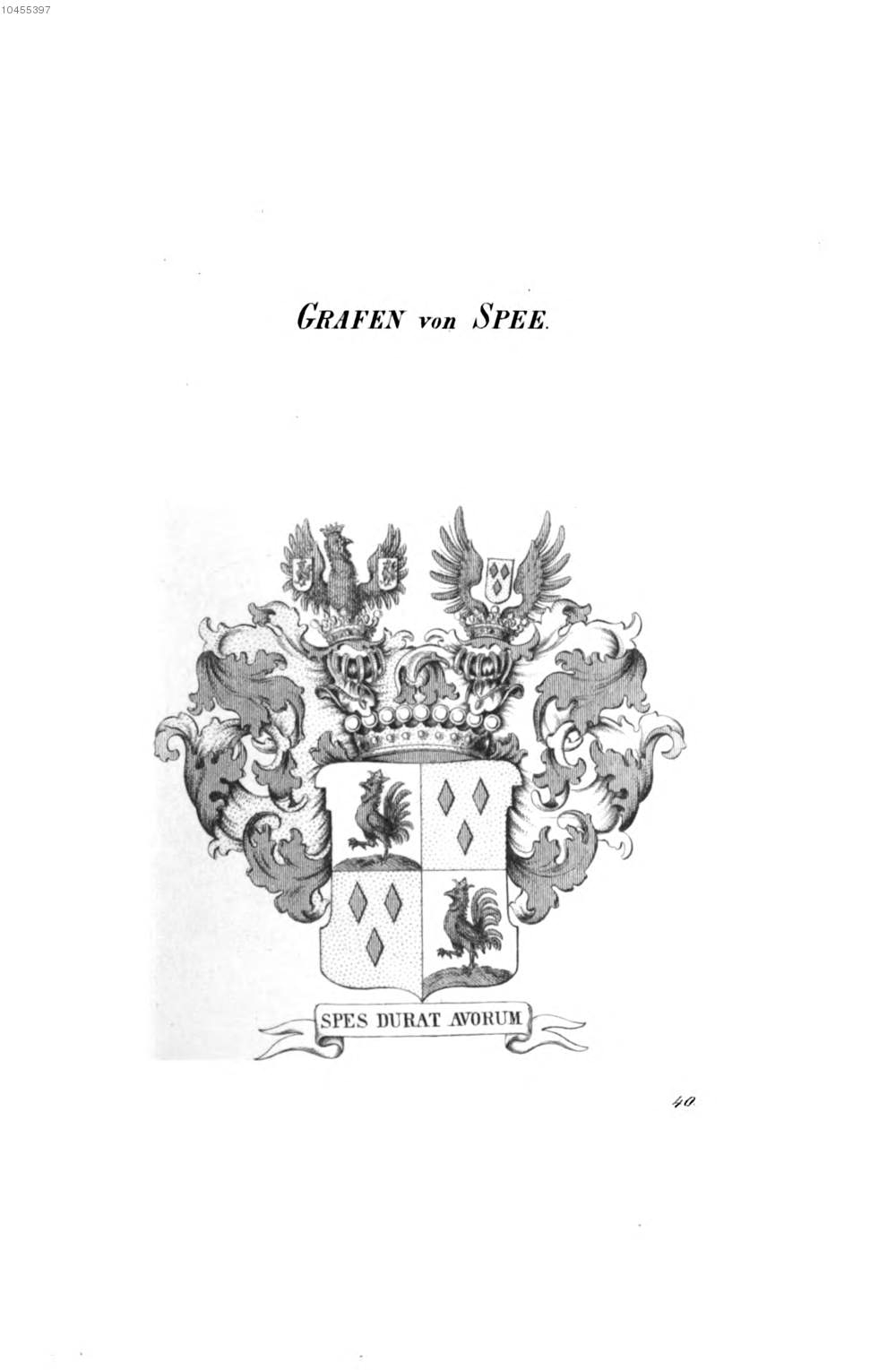
Coat of arms of the Counts von Spee

The Spee family (German: von Spee) is an old Rhenish Catholic noble family from the Archdiocese of Cologne. They are relatives of the Baron von Scheidt family.

== History ==
As one of the first documented members of the family, Bruno Spede was mentioned in 1166 and 1177 as a ministerial servant of the Archbishops of Cologne. It was not until the second half of the 14th century, with Goedeart Spede van Langenvelt, also called Spee, that the now-known rooster appeared in the family crest. This distinguished the Lords of Spee from other Rhineland noble families of the same name.

The family originally belonged to the regional land nobility of the Lower Rhineland. The ancestral seats were Altenhof (near Kaldenkirchen, since 1356, sold in 1833) and Haus Langenfeld in Wachtendonk-Wankum (since 1348, inherited in 1532 by Gaert von Erp called Warrenberg, later part of the Krickenbeck estate of the Counts of Schaesberg). In the 14th and 15th centuries, four family members, as one of the few Rhineland noble families, became knights in the Teutonic Order in Livonia.

Until the 17th century, the branches of Aldenhof (Altenhof), Langenfeld, as well as Haus Velde and Pöhlland existed. All currently living family members descend from the Aldenhof branch.

The family has produced notable members: Friedrich Spee von Langenfeld (1591–1635), a professor of theology and writer, was one of the first to oppose witch hunts and torture. Franz von Spee (1781–1839) served as a high-ranking official in Düsseldorf under the Bavarian, French, and Prussian governments. Maximilian Graf von Spee (1861–1914), Imperial Vice Admiral and Squadron Leader of the German fleet in the naval battles at Coronel and the Falkland Islands, died in the latter battle aboard his flagship, the Scharnhorst. His two sons also died in this battle as naval lieutenants aboard the Nürnberg and Gneisenau.

== Fideikommiss Heltorf ==
In 1662, Friedrich Christian Baron von Spee inherited Heltorf Castle in Düsseldorf-Angermund from his father-in-law, the notable baron Johann Bertram von Scheidt called Weschpfennig. In 1672, at the suggestion of Johann Bertram, Duke Philipp Wilhelm of Jülich-Berg appointed von Spee as war commissioner for the entire Bergische militia. Over time, the family’s land holdings steadily expanded, and the Heltorf branch acquired at least 7000 hectares by 1945. The Lords of Spee held high offices in the regional governments and at the courts of the Rhineland princes. They were raised to the rank of Reichsgraf (Imperial Count) in 1739. Through marriage into the family of the Counts of Hillesheim, their entire estate, including Ahrenthal Castle on the Middle Rhine, passed to the Counts of Spee upon the extinction of the Hillesheim family (in 1785 and 1807). The Counts of Spee are members of the Rhineland Nobility, founded in 1837.

Currently, Wilhelm Count von Spee (*1963) is the head of Heltorf. He succeeded his father, Maximilian Count von Spee (1928–2009), as the eldest son. The main residence at Heltorf in Düsseldorf includes, among other properties, the former knightly estates of Kesselsberg (since 1802) and Remberg (since 1856) in Duisburg-Huckingen, the Gervershagen forest estate in Marienheide (since 1870), and in the Sauerland, Alme Castle with Haus Tinne and Haus Bruch, as well as Haus Almerfeld in Brilon (all since 1912). Haus Böckum in Duisburg-Huckingen was in the family's possession since 1856 and was sold to an investor in 2012. The former family fideikommiss of the Heltorf line, consolidated in the Gräflich von Spee central administration, is estimated to be worth at least one billion euros, including factories, a brickworks, gravel pits, housing, and financial companies.

== Notable members ==
- Friedrich Spee von Lagenfeld (1591–1635)
- Degenhard Betram Baron von Spee zu Aldenhoff (1681–1736)
- Ambrosius Franziskus Count von Spee zu Aldenhoff und Heltorf (1730–1791)
- Carl-Wilhelm von Spee (1758–1810)
- Maximilian von Spee (1861–1914)
- Clarissa von Spee (born 1967)
