= Admiral Graf Spee =

Admiral Graf Spee may refer to:

- Graf Maximilian von Spee (1861–1914), German admiral
- German cruiser Admiral Graf Spee, a 1934 German Navy cruiser (or "pocket battleship") named after Spee
