= House Böckum =

German water castle

Coordinates: 51°21′34″N 6°45′32″E

House Böckum, alternatively Haus Böckum (in old sources also Buechen, Boichem or Boecum) is a medieval noble residence in the Duisburg district of Huckingen on the old Angerbach. Haus Böckum is the only preserved water castle in Duisburg's city area, even if their ditches are mostly dry today.

== Naming ==
The name Böckum derives from Hof zu den Buchen (Hof zo den Buechen) and thus traces back to the beech forest that once extended as far as Böckum. Today, only the Duisburg city forest remains of it.

== History ==
The moated castle was a fief of the Counts of Berg for centuries. The first documented mention dates back to 1345 in the form of the person Thyderich van den Boken, who can be identified as Dietrich von Rheinheim from the noble family of the Lords of Kalkum. Dietrich’s presumed daughter, Mechtild von Rheinheim, brought Böckum into the possession of Hermann von der Seldung (also known as Hermann von der Seeldonck or Hermann von Schlickum) through marriage. He served as Amtmann of Angermund from 1369 to 1391 and pledged Böckum in 1369 (then referred to as Hof zu den Buchen). This same Hermann still owned Böckum in 1402 when he wrote his will, shortly before his death. Böckum then passed to the Lords of Ulenbroich through his daughter.

In 1405, during the Kalkum Feuds, Böckum was destroyed by Cologne mercenaries. From at least 1440 until around 1760, the Lords of Buer owned Böckum. The first recorded owner from this family was Hermann von Buir, who was married to Agnes von Uhlenbroich. Around 1500, their son Heinrich was the owner, followed by his son Hermann around 1540. Until 1608, Hermann’s son Johann von Buir (also spelled von Bawyr) was in possession, succeeded in 1609 by his nephew, Johann Hermann von Bawyr, Lord of Boekem, Romlian, and Frankenberg (Aachen). In 1644, Johann Hermann’s son, Johann von Bawyr, who married the heiress Maria von Scheidt called Weschpfennig zu Heltorf, in 1636, took ownership. After Johann von Bawyr’s death in 1647, his son, Johann Friedrich von Bawyr, held Böckum until 1681.

Johann Friedrich's widow, Maria Freiin von Scheidt, married Baron Friedrich Christian von Spee in 1649 at Haus Böckum. In 1661, baron Johann Bertram von Scheidt called Weschpfennig reported to his son-in-law, Friedrich Christian von Spee, about plans for a new construction of Haus Böckum. Later, the estate belonged to General Friedrich Ferdinand Bawyr von Frankenberg, the son of Johann Friedrich von Bawyr, who requested building timber in 1708. Meanwhile, in 1702, during the siege of Kaiserswerth in the War of Spanish Succession, the estate’s farm buildings were burned down.

After the Buer/Bawyr male line died out in the mid-18th century, the heirs sold the estate in 1767 to Theodor von Hallberg. He granted a tenancy to Peter Blumenkamp and Catharina Christina Broickerhoff at Haus Böckum. In 1801, the industrialist and Kommerzienrat Johann Gottfried Brügelmann from Ratingen purchased the estate. After his death in 1802, it passed to his son, Johann Gottfried Jr. Upon his death in 1808, his daughter Charlotte inherited it. In 1856, as the widow of Karl Heinrich Engelbert von Oven, she sold the estate to the Count of Spee, whose family owned it until 2012, when they sold it to the Berlin-based investor S+P Real Estate.

Haus Böckum also held Stroetrecht (from Stroet, meaning bush, thicket, or undergrowth). This was the right to keep wild horses in the forest, a privilege granted only to a few noble estates besides the Duke of Berg, including Böckum, Heltorf, Broich, Haus zum Haus, Groß-Winkelhausen, Oefte, and Landsberg.

== Current condition and use ==
The present U-shaped complex was built in multiple phases. The oldest section is the eastern part of the building, featuring a tower made of exposed brick with a curved, slate-covered roof. This section, including the gatehouse and the masonry stone bridge that replaced a former drawbridge, was constructed in 1661 as a manor house, replacing an older castle complex that once stood on the now unbuilt northern part of the moated site.

The remaining buildings, dating from the 18th and 19th centuries, were agricultural utility structures and continued to be commercially used for farming until 2008 by a tenant couple.

The entire estate has been under monument protection since June 27, 1991. However, the investor’s 2017-approved plan to convert the property into residential buildings was never realized. In February 2017, one of the poultry barns belonging to Haus Böckum burned down. The remaining poultry barns have since been demolished, the castle grounds have been fenced off, and entry is prohibited.

Due to the estate’s deterioration, the City of Duisburg has initiated regulatory proceedings against the owner, as the condition of the castle has worsened in recent years. Furthermore, the historic property has increasingly become a target of vandalism and is now up for sale.
