= Heinrich Mücke =

German painter

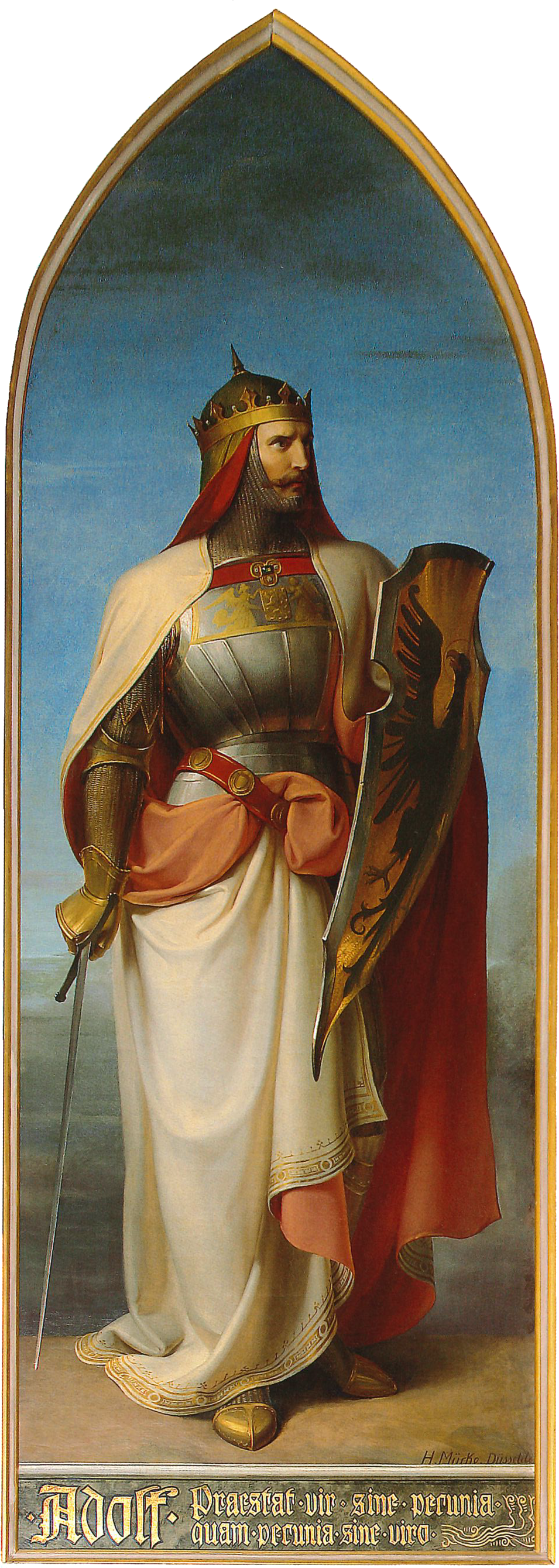
Adolf, King of the Romans (1841)

Heinrich Karl Anton Mücke (9 April 1806 – 16 January 1891) was a German painter known for his liturgical and genre paintings as well as frescoes, which still adorn some of Germany's ancient castles and cathedrals. Museums that hold his paintings include the National Gallery Berlin, Breslau Museum, and the Brunn Museum. His son, Karl Mücke, was also a recognized genre painter. Heinrich Mücke was a professor at the Düsseldorf Academy and received the Portuguese Medal for Art and Sciences as well as the Breslau Medal. He is associated with the Düsseldorf school of painting.

== Early life and travels ==
Heinrich Mücke was born in Breslau, then in Prussia and today in Poland. He received formal training in art at both the Berlin Academy and the Düsseldorf Academy. Mücke worked under the well established painter Friedrich Wilhelm Schadow. Mücke traveled frequently, Italy being his first extended foreign sojourn over the winter of 1834–35. In 1850 he visited England, and he vacationed in Switzerland many times. From earliest predilections, he chose historical religious subjects, especially those containing dramatic or exalted themes.

== Liturgical paintings ==
Biblical topics were the first for which Mücke was well known. In his early painting career he completed such works as: Saint Catherine carried by Angels to Mount Sinai (1836); Saint Ambrose and Emperor Theodosius (1838); Saint Elizabeth taking Farewell of her Husband (1841); Saint Elizabeth Giving Alms (1841), the last of which pieces is hung in the National Gallery Berlin, Alte Nationalgalerie. Further liturgical oils of the late 1840s, early 1850s and undated works are: Coronation of the Virgin (1847); Saint Adelbert (1851); Cycle of Life of Saint Meinrad; Good Shepherd; and Christ Crucified.

== Paintings of noble life, genre scenes and portraiture ==
Mücke also attended to other subject matter, especially while in his early forties. His history paintings include Dante in Verona (1846) and Cleopatra Dying (1873). His Male Portrait (1861) is in the Düsseldorf Museum. An example of his genre work is his painting Mother and Child (ca. 1850; destroyed by wildfire in 2017)

== The frescoes ==
Mücke painted frescoes in some of the notable old buildings in Germany. The earliest well-known example is a series of paintings produced over a nine-year period at Castle Heltorf near Düsseldorf: Scenes from life of Barbarossa (1829–1938).

== Karl Mücke, Heinrich's son ==
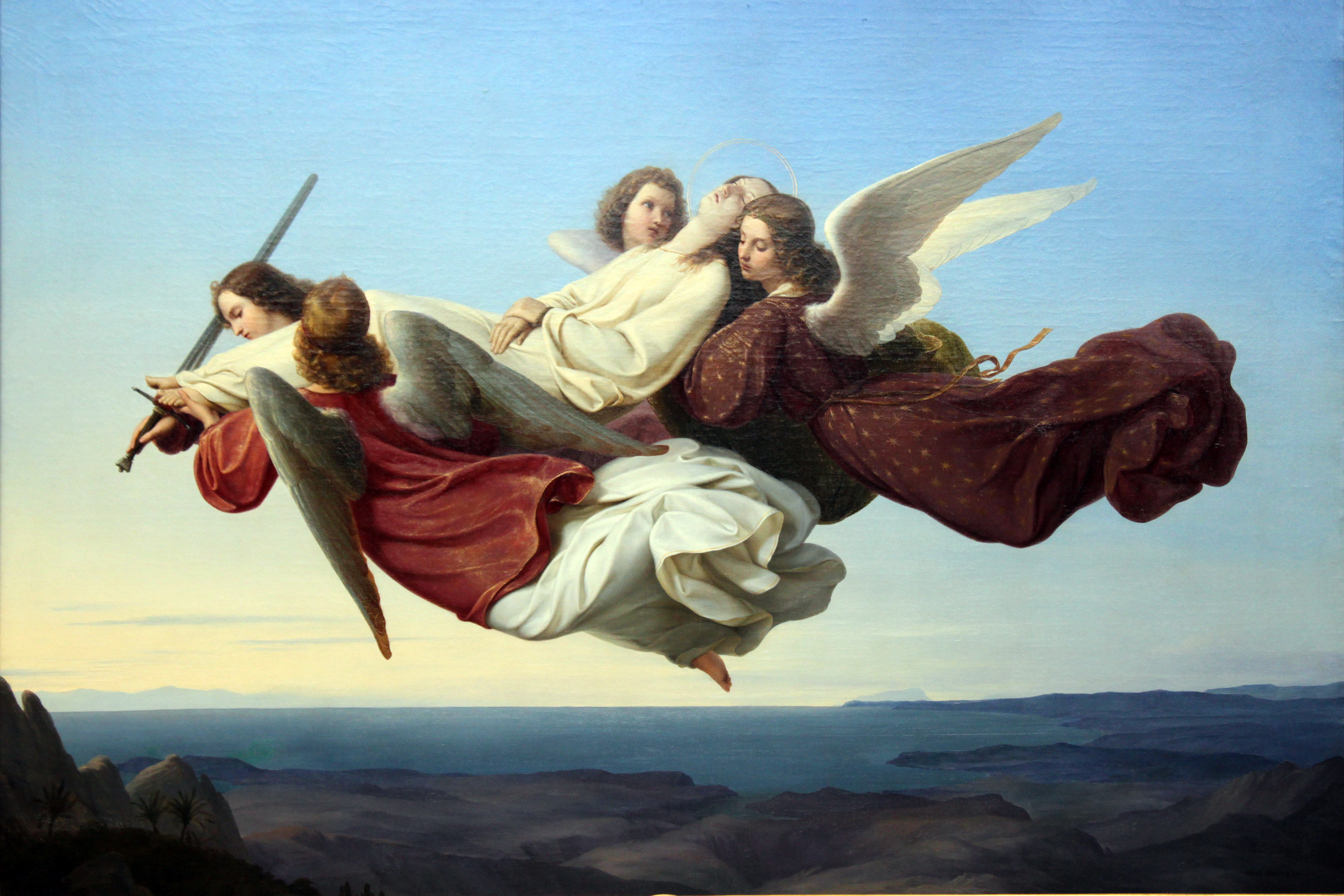
The Corpse of St. Catherine (1836)

Karl Mücke was born in 1847 and studied under his father. Karl became a distinguished painter in his own right, although not as renowned as his father. He specialized in genre painting and is recognized for such works as Little Brother, Sunday Afternoon, Mother's Joy, Paternal Joys and Mending Nets on the Coast of Holland. Karl died on 27 May 1923.

== Permanent collections ==
- Breslau Museum
- Brunn Museum
- Chemnitz Museum
- Düsseldorf Museum
- National Gallery Berlin

== Bibliography ==
- Cyclopedia of Painters, Vol. 3, ed. by John Denison Champlin, Empire State Book Co. (1927)
- E. Benézit, Dictionnaire de Peinteurs, Sculpteurs, Dessinateurs et Graveurs, 1st ed. 1911, revised 1976
- Michael Bryan, Bryan's Dictionary of Painters, C. Bell and Sons, London (1927)
- Wiegmann, p118
