= Nzante Spee =

Cameroonian artist

Sunday Nzante Spee
- Born: 1953; Cameroon
- Died: 25 May 2005 (aged 51–52); Stockton
- Citizenship: Cameroon
- Education: Fine Arts School of Nigeria and Ivory Coast
- Occupation: Painter

Sunday Nzante Spee (Mbem, 1953 – Stockton, California, USA May 25, 2005) was a Cameroonian artist.

When he was a teenager, he used to make some paintings and decorations in façades. From 1976 to 1982, he attended the Fine Arts School of Nigeria and Ivory Coast.

Despite the difficulties of having an artistic career in Cameroon, he decided to establish an atelier and a training centre in Bamenda, the Spee Art Center, where he could make a living from his works, and he influenced the next generations.

His style, from cubism to surrealism and addressed to a naïve caricature but full with provocative humour, culminates in a pictorial world where all these expressions are mixed in the so-called melting age aesthetic.
