= Clarissa von Spee =

German art historian

Clarissa Hildegard Apollonia Huberta Maria Countess von Spee (9 February 1967 in Rhede) is a German art historian specializing in Chinese art. She hails from the von Spee family.

== Early life ==
Clarissa von Spee was born on February 9, 1967, in Rhede, Germany, into the noble von Spee family. She grew up in Germany, where she developed an early interest in art and culture. As a young girl, she enjoyed painting ceramics. Her academic pursuits led her to study East Asian art history at Heidelberg University, where she was particularly influenced by renowned sinologist Lothar Ledderose. During her studies, she expanded her knowledge through international experiences, spending time at universities in Taipei, Shanghai, and Paris. These formative years laid the foundation for her future career in curatorial work and academic research on Chinese and East Asian art.

== Career ==
After completing her doctorate under Lothar Ledderose at Heidelberg University in 2002, von Spee began her professional career as an assistant at the chair of East Asian Art History in Heidelberg. She later worked at the Museum of East Asian Art in Cologne, where she gained hands-on curatorial experience.

In 2008, von Spee was appointed curator in the Department of Asia at the British Museum in London. She was responsible for the museum's collections of Chinese and Central Asian art and organized several major exhibitions, including The Printed Image in China from the 8th to the 21st Centuries (2010), Modern Chinese Ink Paintings (2012), and Gems of Chinese Painting – A Voyage along the Yangzi River (2014).

Her work at the British Museum solidified her reputation as an expert in Chinese art, leading her to receive a Leverhulme Research Fellowship in 2016. As part of this fellowship, she conducted research in the Jiangnan region of China, focusing on historical artistic traditions.

Following this, von Spee joined the Cleveland Museum of Art as the James and Donna Reid Curator of Chinese Art and Chair of Asian Art. At the museum, she curated several high-profile exhibitions, such as Cai Guo-Qiang – Cuyahoga River Lightning (2019), China through the Magnifying Glass – Masterpieces in Miniature and Detail (2022), China’s Southern Paradise – Treasures from the Lower Yangzi Delta (2023/24), and Demons, Ghosts, and Goblins in Chinese Art (2024). In addition to her curatorial responsibilities, she also served as interim curator of the museum's Islamic art department.

Beyond her museum work, von Spee has been engaged in academia. Since 2013, she has been a fellow at the Center of Visual Studies at the China Academy of Art in Hangzhou, and in 2022, she was appointed a visiting professor at the institution.

== Personal life ==
Von Spee is married to James Godfrey. The couple relocated to Cleveland, Ohio, in 2016 when she accepted her position at the Cleveland Museum of Art.
