= Schloss Heltorf =

Historic castle in Düsseldorf, Germany

Coordinates: 51.3420°N 6.7704°E

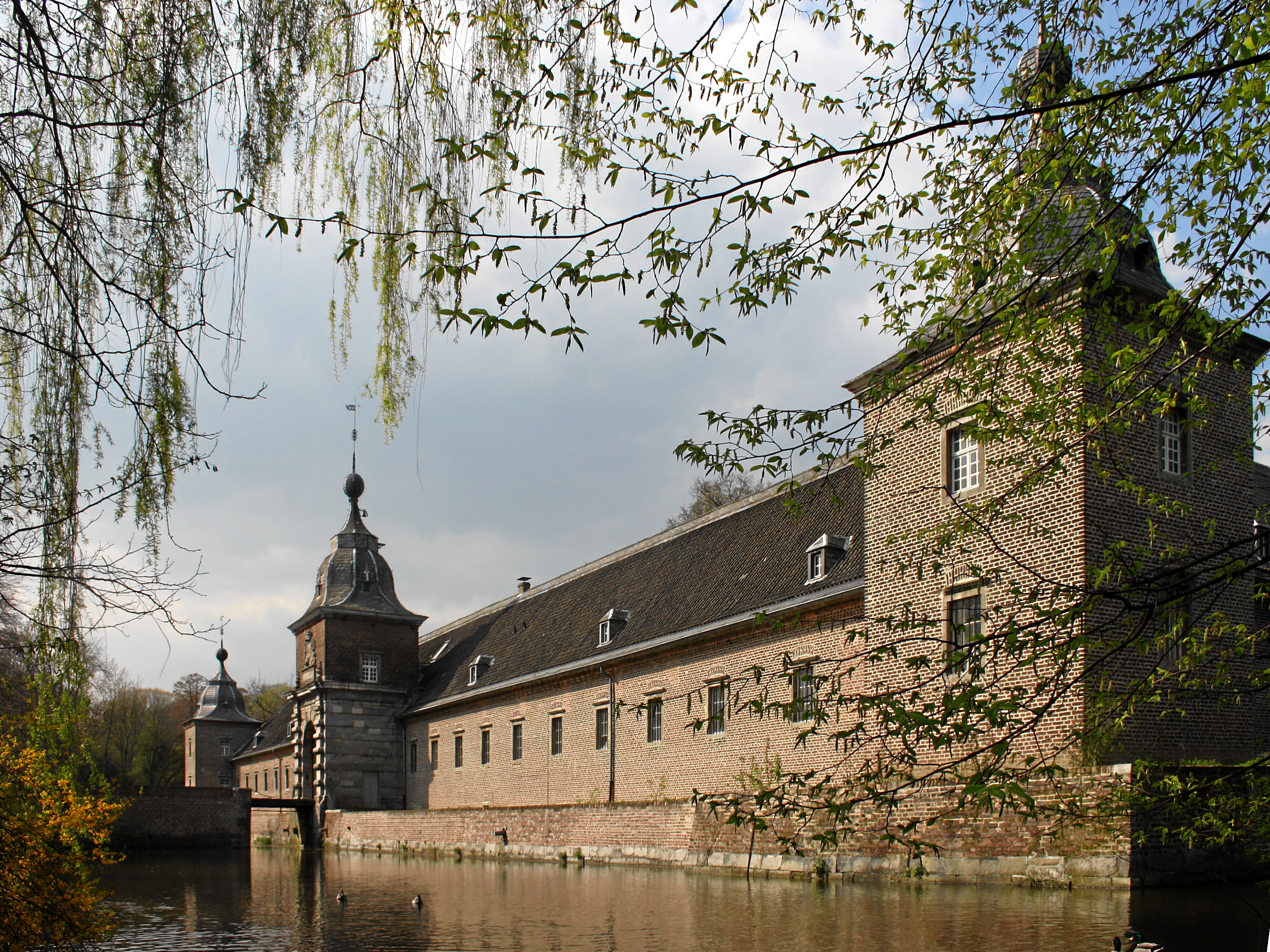

Heltorf Castle (German: Schloß Heltorf) is a water castle located in Düsseldorf, North Rhine-Westphalia, Germany. First mentioned in the 11th century as Hof Helethorpe, the castle has a history tied to noble families such as the Lords of Heldorp, the von Troisdorf family, the von Scheidt Barons, and the Counts of Spee, who still own it today. The castle's current mansion was constructed in the early 19th century in the classicist style, featuring notable frescoes depicting scenes from the reign of Frederick Barbarossa.

Surrounded by a 54-hectare English landscape park designed by Maximilian Weyhe in 1803, Schloss Heltorf is known for its rare rhododendron plantings (second-oldest in Germany) and annual open-air Marian celebration. While the castle itself is not open to the public, the park welcomes visitors from May to October on weekends and public holidays. Heltorf is the biggest palace in Düsseldorf, since 1662, and serves as the homestead of the noble family Grafen von Spee.

== History ==
The castle was built for the management of agricultural and forestry goods in the area. It is a water castle. Forestry has been in the area since the 12th century.

Heltorf is first mentioned in the 11th century. Century as Hof Helethorpe in the pension register of the Kaiserswerth Abbey (German: Kaiserpfalz Kaiserswerth).

The early owners were the Lords of Heldorp. Otto von Heldorp is already mentioned as the owner of Schloss Heltorf in 1167. Furthermore, it appears in the document of about 1189, in which noble lord Arnold von Teveren pledges his entire right-rhine property to Holthausen, Düsseldorf, Buscherhof, Eickenberg near Millrath, Monheim, Himmelgeist, on the banks of the Rhine near Holthausen and on the Anger for 100 marks to Engelbert I von Berg. Zobodonus de Heldorp, probably identical to the Albertus (called Zobbe von Heltorf), who was mentioned at the same time, appears as a witness in the conferral of city rights to Düsseldorf in 1288.

In 1360, Heltorf was sold by Adolf von Graschafand his wife Jutta von Stein to Thomas von Lohausen called Troisdorf and his wife Aleide von Geynhoven. For 5 to 6 generations, Schloss Heltorf remained in this family, which later called itself von Troisdorf, until the heiress, Maria, daughter of Sibert von Troisdorf, brought it into her marriage with Wilhelm von Scheid (called Weschpfennig) in 1569.

Their granddaughter Maria, daughter of the ducal grand court master Johann Bertram von Scheid (called Weschpfennig) and Margaretha von Tengnagel, married Friedrich Christian von Spee in 1649 in Haus Böckum in second marriage. As a result, Schloss Heltorf came in 1662, after the death of Maria's parents, to the Counts of Spee, in whose possession it remains today.

== Building ==
The mansion was built at the beginning of the 19th century in the classicist style according to plans of the Essen architect Heinrich Theodor Freyse. Inside, the frescoes of the Barbarossa cycle in the large garden hall are remarkable: the reconciliation of Frederick and the Pope with Venice and a supraporte are an early work of 1826 by the historical painter Karl Stürmer, the main part in the painting of the hall was taken over by Heinrich Mücke with The abolition of the eights imposed on Henry the Lion at the Reichstag in Erfurt (completed in 1829), humiliation of the Milanese of 1833, Frederick I's crowning of the emperor and a supraporte painted in gris in 1837 and in 1838 the single pictures of St. Bernhard, preaching the Crusade and Bishop Otto von Freising, Karl Friedrich Lessing painted the Battle of Iconium in 1831 and Hermann Freihold Plüddemann the Storming of Iconium in 1840 by Friedrich von Schwaben and the death of Friedrich in 1841. In addition, the castle has an extensive collection of old books, the Graflich von Spee'sche Bibliothek Schloss Heltorf in the tower-like annex built by Count Wilhelm in 1862 by the Cologne cathedral builder Vincenz Statz.

The castle is not accessible to the public.

In the castle chapel next to the mansion, masses take place every Sunday at 11:00 a.m.

== Park ==
Designed as an English forest park, the castle's park is centred on the castle pond. The idea of the design of the garden in the English style comes from the French Abbé Biarelle from 1796. It was executed by Maximilian Weyhe in 1803. Special features at the time are exotic woody plants, such as the second oldest rhododendron planting in Germany. The park covers an area of 54 hectares. It is open to the public from April to October on weekends and public holidays.

Every year on Ascension Day at 4:00 p.m., an open-air Marian celebration is organized in the castle park with guests from the surrounding towns.

== Agriculture and forestry ==
Forestry operations will continue at Schloss Heltorf. The management is based on the principle of sustainable management. The castle includes extensive land in Düsseldorf and the southern Ruhr area.
