= Maximilian von Spee =

German naval officer (1861–1914)

Reichsgraf Maximilian von Spee
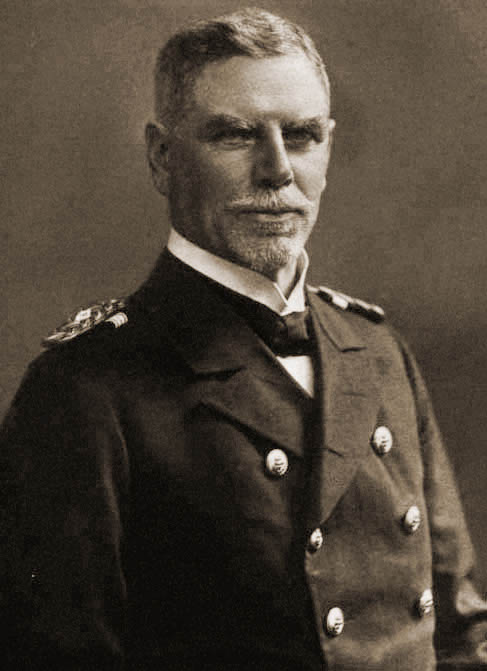
- Maximilian von Spee
- Born: 22 June 1861; Copenhagen, Denmark
- Died: 8 December 1914 (aged 53); SMS Scharnhorst, South Atlantic, off the Falkland Islands
- Military career
- Allegiance: German Empire
- Branch: Imperial German Navy
- Service years: 1878–1914
- Rank: Vizeadmiral (Vice Admiral)
- Commands: SMS Natter; SMS Hela; SMS Pelikan; SMS Wittelsbach; East Asia Squadron
- Conflicts: Boxer Uprising; World War I; Battle of Papeete; Battle of Coronel; Battle of the Falkland Islands †

Maximilian Johannes Maria Hubert Reichsgraf von Spee (22 June 1861 – 8 December 1914) was a German naval officer in the Imperial German Navy (Kaiserliche Marine), who commanded the East Asia Squadron during World War I. Spee entered the navy in 1878 and served in a variety of roles and locations, including on a colonial gunboat in German West Africa in the 1880s, the East Africa Squadron in the late 1890s, and as commander of several warships in the main German fleet in the early 1900s. During his time in Germany in the late 1880s and early 1890s, he married his wife, Margareta, and had three children, his sons Heinrich and Otto and his daughter Huberta. By 1912, he had returned to the East Asia Squadron as its commander, and was promoted to the rank of Vizeadmiral (Vice Admiral) the following year.

Following the outbreak of World War I in July 1914, Spee led his squadron across the Pacific to the coast of South America. There on 1 November, he defeated the British 4th Cruiser Squadron under Rear Admiral Christopher Cradock in the Battle of Coronel, sinking two of Cradock's cruisers and forcing his other two ships to retreat. A month later, Spee decided to attack the British naval base in the Falkland Islands, but a superior British force surprised him. In the ensuing Battle of the Falkland Islands, Vice Admiral Doveton Sturdee's squadron, which included two powerful battlecruisers, destroyed the East Asia Squadron. Spee and his two sons, who happened to be serving on two of his ships, were all killed, along with about 2,200 other men. Spee was hailed as a hero in Germany, and several ships were named in his honor, including the heavy cruiser Admiral Graf Spee, which was built in the 1930s and was scuttled after the Battle of the River Plate during World War II.

== Early career ==
Spee as a Kapitänleutnant aboard the armored cruiser SMS Deutschland in East Asia in 1898

Spee was born in Copenhagen, Denmark, on 22 June 1861, though he was raised in the Rhineland in Germany, where his Spee family had an estate. He joined the Kaiserliche Marine (Imperial Navy) in 1878 and initially served in the main German naval base at Kiel. He was commissioned an officer at the rank of Leutnant zur See (lieutenant at sea), and was assigned to the gunboat SMS Möwe, which was sent to western Africa. During this voyage, the Germans signed treaties with local rulers in Togo and Cameroon, creating the colonies of Togoland and Kamerun, respectively. In 1887, Spee was transferred to Kamerun where he commanded the port at Duala. He contracted rheumatic fever while there, and had to be sent back to Germany to recover, though he occasionally suffered from rheumatism for the rest of his life.

After returning to Germany in 1889, he married Margareta Baroness von der Osten-Sacken. With her he had two sons—Otto, born on 10 July 1890, Heinrich, born on 24 April 1893—and one daughter, Huberta, born on 11 July 1894. By 1895, Spee had been promoted to the rank of Kapitänleutnant (captain lieutenant). From 1 May to 12 September that year, Spee commanded the ironclad gunboat Natter. In December 1897, Spee was stationed in Germany's East Asia Squadron after it seized the Jiaozhou Bay Leased Territory, with its port at Qingdao. Here, he served on the staff of Vizeadmiral (Vice Admiral) Otto von Diederichs. During the Boxer Uprising in China in 1900, Spee saw action at Qingdao and on the Yangtze.

After arriving back in Germany, he was promoted to the rank of Korvettenkapitän (Corvette Captain) and assigned as the first officer aboard the pre-dreadnought battleship Brandenburg. Between 1900 and 1908, Spee held command of several ships, including the aviso Hela, the minelayer Pelikan, and finally the pre-dreadnought Wittelsbach. During this period, he was promoted to Fregattenkapitän (Frigate Captain) on 27 January 1904 and to Kapitän zur See (Captain at Sea) exactly a year later; his command of Wittelsbach followed the latter promotion. In 1908, he was assigned as the chief of staff to the commander of the North Sea Station, and in 1910 he was promoted to the rank of Konteradmiral (KAdm–Counter Admiral). Spee was then assigned as the deputy commander for the reconnaissance forces of the High Seas Fleet.

== East Asia Squadron ==
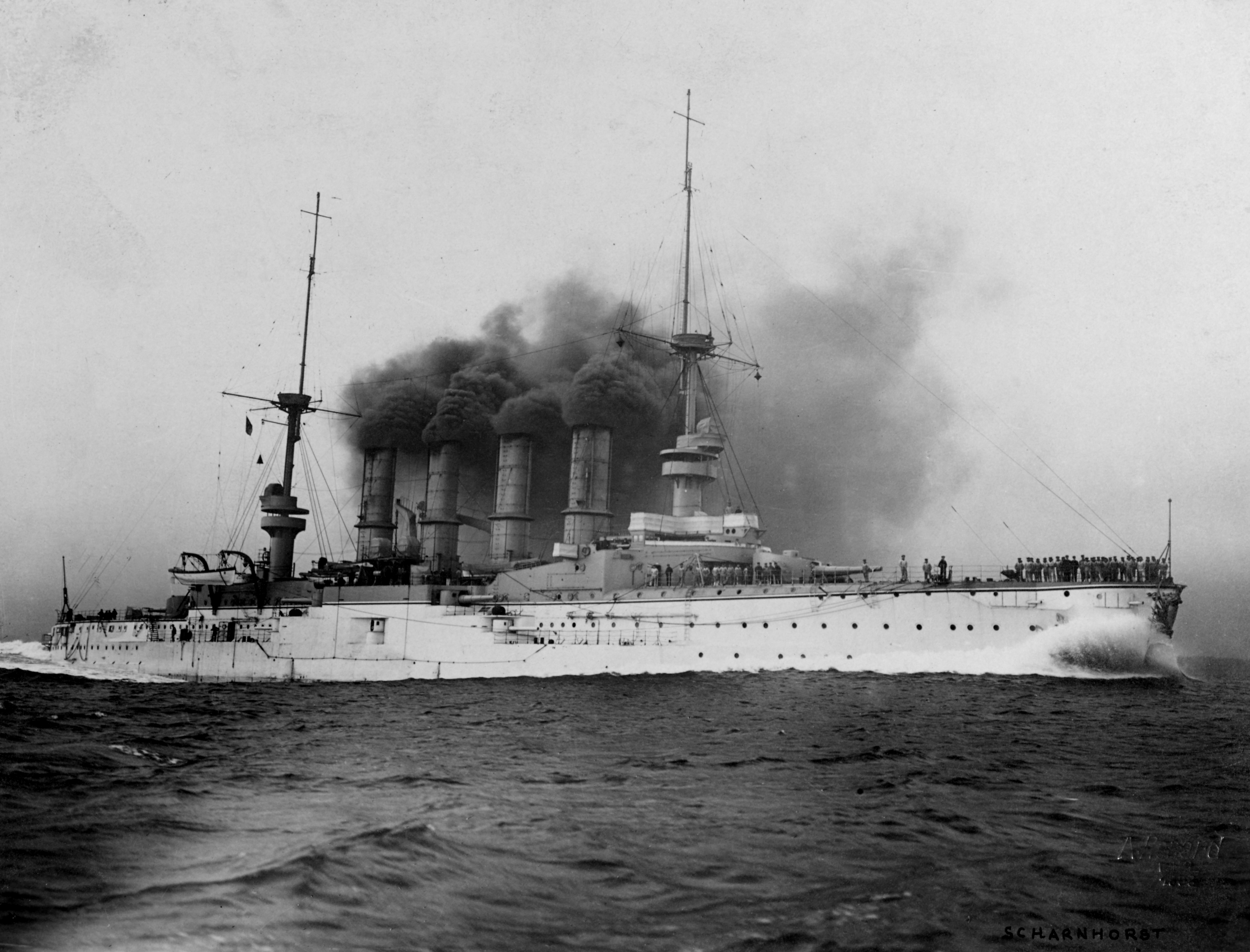
Spee's flagship, the armored cruiser SMS Scharnhorst

In late 1912, Spee was given command of the East Asia Squadron, replacing KAdm Günther von Krosigk on 4 December. Spee raised his flag on the armored cruiser Scharnhorst, and departed on a tour of the southwest Pacific along with Scharnhorst's sister ship Gneisenau, during which Spee made visits to several ports, including Singapore and Batavia. Spee was promoted to Vizeadmiral the following year. Over the following year and a half, Spee met with the leaders of several East Asian countries. From 1 April to 7 May 1913, Scharnhorst took Spee to Japan to meet the Taishō Emperor. Later in the year, Spee met with Chulalongkorn, the King of Siam. In May 1914, Spee took Scharnhorst and the torpedo boat S90 on a visit to Port Arthur and then to Tianjin; Spee continued on to Beijing, where he met with Yuan Shikai, the first President of the Republic of China. He came back aboard Scharnhorst on 11 May and the ship returned to Qingdao.

Spee thereafter began preparations for a cruise to German New Guinea; Scharnhorst departed on 20 June. The two armored cruisers proceeded to Nagasaki, Japan, where they coaled in preparation for their tour. While en route to Truk in the Caroline Islands, they received news of the assassination of Archduke Franz Ferdinand, heir to the throne of Austria-Hungary. On 17 July, the East Asia Squadron arrived in Ponape in the Carolines, where the ships remained while tensions steadily rose in Europe. In Ponape, Spee had access to the German radio network, and he learned of the Austro-Hungarian declaration of war on Serbia on 28 July, followed shortly thereafter by the Russian mobilization—tantamount to a declaration of war—against Austria-Hungary and possibly Germany. On 31 July, word came that the German ultimatum that Russia demobilize its armies was set to expire; Spee ordered his ships' crews to prepare for war. On 2 August, Wilhelm II ordered German mobilization against Russia and its ally, France. Following Germany's violation of neutral Belgium during its invasion of France, Britain declared war on Germany.

=== World War I ===
Map showing the route of the East Asia Squadron

The East Asia Squadron consisted of Scharnhorst and Gneisenau and the light cruisers Emden, Nürnberg, and Leipzig. At the time, Nürnberg was returning from the west coast of the United States, where Leipzig had just replaced her, and Emden was still in Qingdao. Spee recalled his ships to consolidate his forces; Nürnberg arrived on 6 August and the three cruisers plus their colliers moved to Pagan Island in the Marianas, at that time a German colony. Emden and the liner Prinz Eitel Friedrich, which had been converted into an auxiliary cruiser, joined the squadron there on 12 August. The four cruisers, accompanied by Prinz Eitel Friedrich and several colliers, then departed the central Pacific, bound for Chile. On 13 August, Commodore Karl von Müller, captain of the Emden, persuaded Spee to detach his ship as a commerce raider. On 14 August, the East Asia Squadron departed Pagan for Enewetak Atoll in the Marshall Islands. While en route across the Pacific, Spee relaxed formalities aboard his ships, integrating the messes for officers and non-commissioned and engineering officers.

To keep the German high command informed, on 8 September Spee detached Nürnberg to Honolulu to send word through neutral countries. Nürnberg returned with news of the Allied capture of German Samoa, which had taken place on 29 August. Scharnhorst and Gneisenau sailed to Apia to investigate the situation. Spee had hoped to catch a British or Australian warship by surprise, but upon his arrival on 14 September, he found no warships in the harbor. Spee decided against attacking the Allied troops ashore, since doing so would risk killing Samoans and damaging German property. On 22 September, Scharnhorst and the rest of the East Asia Squadron arrived at the French colony of Papeete. The Germans attacked the colony, and in the ensuing Battle of Papeete, they sank the French gunboat Zélée. The ships came under fire from French shore batteries but were undamaged. Fear of mines in the harbor prevented Spee from seizing the coal in the harbor. Spee then continued across the Pacific, passing through the Marquesas Islands, where his ships acquired supplies including fresh meat by barter, purchase, or confiscation. On 12 October, the squadron reached Easter Island, where it was reinforced by Leipzig, Dresden, and four more colliers. Spee's ships were off the coast of Chile by 1 November, when he learned that the British cruiser Glasgow was moored in Coronel, ostensibly alone; he decided to try to sink the ship.

==== Battle of Coronel ====
Glasgow was assigned to the 4th Cruiser Squadron, under Rear Admiral Christopher Cradock; as it turned out, Glasgow was joined by the armored cruisers Good Hope and Monmouth and the auxiliary cruiser Otranto. After discovering the entire squadron off Coronel, Spee decided to engage the British ships, but he delayed the action using his ships' superior speed until later in the day, when the setting sun would silhouette Cradock's ships. The German ships would meanwhile be obscured against the Chilean coast, making the task of the British gunners more difficult. At 18:07, Spee issued the order to open fire, with his two armored cruisers battling Cradock's armored cruisers and his light cruisers engaging Glasgow and Otranto. Cradock quickly detached Otranto, as she had no place in the line of battle. By 18:50, Gneisenau had disabled Monmouth and so shifted fire to Good Hope; the combined firepower of Scharnhorst and Gneisenau neutralized Good Hope by 19:23. Spee then withdrew his two armored cruisers and sent in his light cruisers to finish off Monmouth and Good Hope. The British had lost both ships and suffered more than 1,600 dead, including Cradock, though the German ships had expended around 40 percent of their ammunition supply. Spee had inflicted the first defeat on a Royal Navy squadron since the Napoleonic Wars a century earlier.

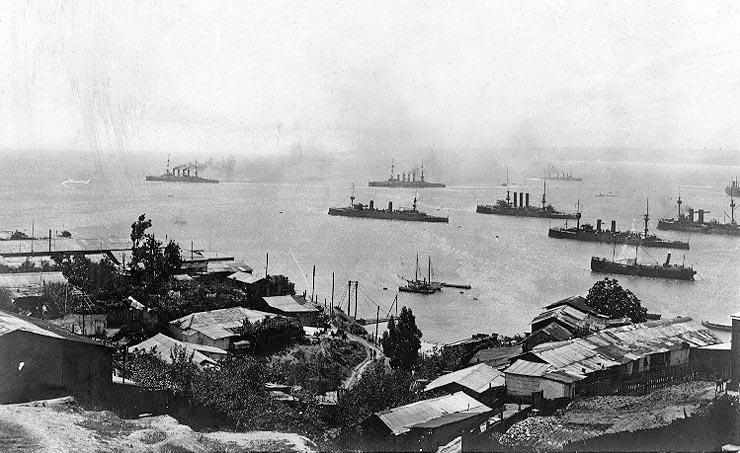
The German squadron leaving Valparaíso on 3 November after the battle

After the battle, Spee took his ships north to Valparaiso. Since Chile was neutral, only three ships could enter the port at a time; Spee took Scharnhorst, Gneisenau, and Nürnberg in first on the morning of 3 November, leaving Dresden and Leipzig with the colliers at Mas a Fuera. There, Spee's ships could take on coal while he conferred with the Admiralty Staff in Germany to determine the strength of remaining British forces in the region. In addition, Spee sought to counter British press reports that attempted to minimize their losses and exaggerate German casualties. A reception followed at the German Club of Valparaiso, though Spee insisted that the event be restrained in tone. He received a bouquet of flowers to celebrate the victory at Coronel; Spee replied that they would do nicely for his grave. He stated that,

You must not forget that I am quite homeless. I cannot reach Germany. We possess no other secure harbor. I must fight my way through the seas of the world doing as much mischief as I can, until my ammunition is exhausted, or a foe far superior in power succeeds in catching me. But it will cost the wretches dearly before they take me down.

While in port, Spee received the order from the Admiralty Staff to attempt to break through to Germany. The ships remained in the port for only 24 hours, in accordance with the neutrality restrictions, and arrived at Mas a Fuera on 6 November, where they took on more coal from captured British and French steamers. Dresden and Leipzig took their turn in Valparaiso, after which the re-formed squadron continued south and rounded Cape Horn into the South Atlantic. In the meantime, the Royal Navy sent a pair of battlecruisers—Invincible and Inflexible—commanded by Vice Admiral Doveton Sturdee to hunt down Spee's squadron and avenge Cradock's defeat.

==== Battle of the Falkland Islands ====
On the morning of 6 December, Spee held a conference with the ship commanders aboard Scharnhorst to determine their next course of action. The Germans had received numerous fragmentary and contradictory reports of British reinforcements in the region; Spee and two other captains favored an attack on the Falkland Islands to destroy the British wireless station there, while three other commanders argued that it would be better to bypass the islands and attack British shipping off Argentina. Spee's opinion carried the day and the squadron departed for the Falkland Islands at 12:00 on 6 December. The ships arrived off the Falkland Islands two days later; Gneisenau and Nürnberg were delegated for the attack. As they approached, observers aboard Gneisenau spotted smoke rising from Port Stanley, but assumed it was the British burning their coal stocks to prevent the Germans from seizing them. As they closed on the harbor, 30.5 cm (12.0 in) shells from the elderly battleship Canopus, which had been beached as a guard ship, began to fall around the German ships, which prompted Spee to break off the attack. As Spee withdrew, Sturdee quickly got steam up in his ships and sortied to chase the Germans.

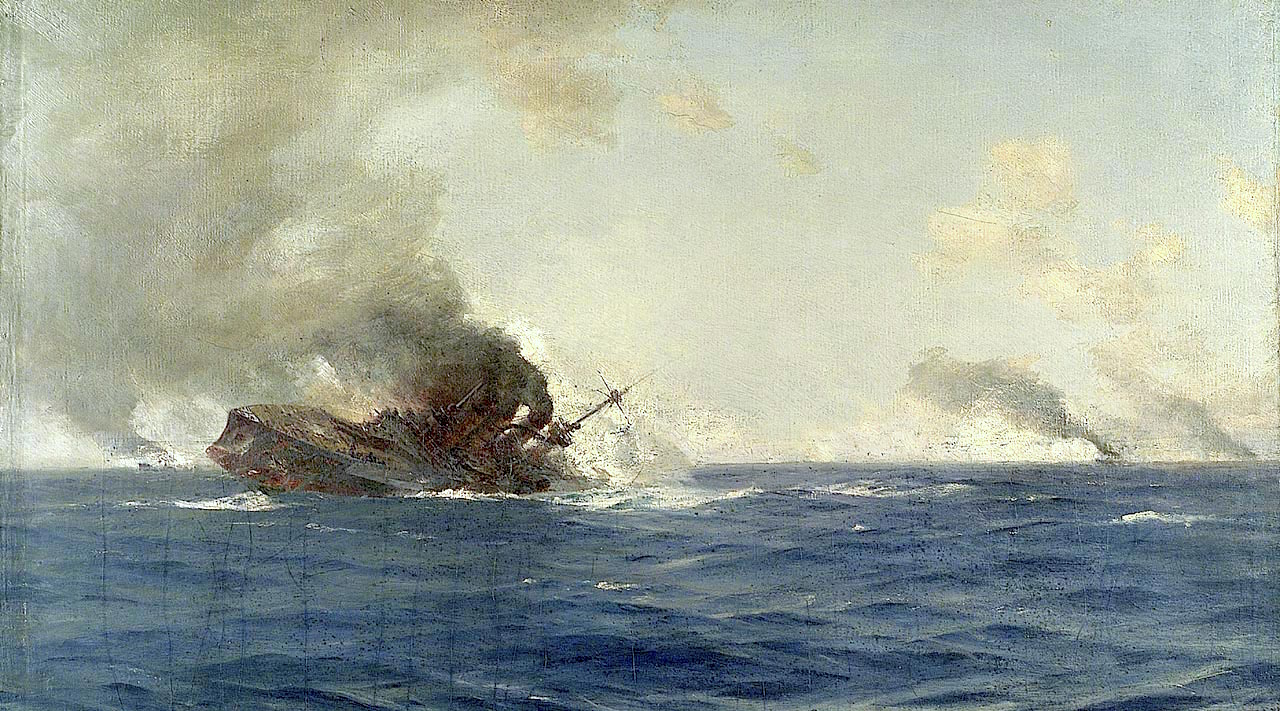
Oil painting of Scharnhorst capsizing during the battle, painted by Thomas Somerscales

By 13:20, the battlecruisers had caught up with Spee, who realized his armored cruisers could not escape the much faster battlecruisers. He ordered the three light cruisers to attempt to break away while he tried to hold off the British squadron with Scharnhorst and Gneisenau. Sturdee instead ordered his cruisers to chase down the fleeing German light cruisers while Invincible and Inflexible dealt with Scharnhorst and Gneisenau. Spee deftly maneuvered his ships, taking the leeward position; the wind kept his ships swept of smoke, which improved visibility for his gunners. This forced Sturdee into the windward position and its corresponding worse visibility. Scharnhorst straddled Invincible with her third salvo and quickly scored two hits on the British battlecruiser. The German flagship was herself not hit during this phase of the battle. Sturdee attempted to widen the distance by turning two points to the north to prevent Spee from closing to within the range of his numerous secondary guns. Spee counteracted this maneuver by turning rapidly to the south, which forced Sturdee to turn south as well to keep within range. This allowed Scharnhorst and Gneisenau to turn back north and get close enough to engage with their secondary 15 cm guns. Their shooting was so accurate that it forced the British to haul away a second time.

The British gunfire became increasingly accurate, and by 16:00, Scharnhorst had begun to list badly, while fires raged aboard the ship. Spee ordered Gneisenau to try to disengage while he turned Scharnhorst toward his attackers in an attempt to launch torpedoes at them. At 16:17, Scharnhorst capsized and sank, taking her entire crew with her, including Spee. The British, still focused on Gneisenau, made no effort to rescue survivors. Gneisenau, Leipzig, and Nürnberg were also sunk. Only Dresden managed to escape, but she was eventually tracked to the Juan Fernández Islands and sunk. The complete destruction of the squadron killed about 2,200 German sailors and officers, including both of Spee's sons; Heinrich died aboard Gneisenau, and Otto was killed aboard Nürnberg.

== Legacy ==
Spee was hailed as a hero in Germany and the men of the East Asia Squadron were celebrated in the press, which emphasized their bravery and refusal to surrender. In September 1917, the second Mackensen-class battlecruiser was named Graf Spee, and was christened by Spee's widow Margarete. Construction of the ship had not been completed by the time of the Armistice of 11 November 1918, and she was broken up for scrap by 1921. In 1934 Germany named the new heavy cruiser Admiral Graf Spee after him; as with the earlier vessel, a member of Spee's family christened the ship, this time his daughter. In December 1939, Admiral Graf Spee was scuttled by her crew after the Battle of the River Plate off the coast of Uruguay. Between 1959 and 1964 the Federal German Bundesmarine operated the training frigate Graf Spee.

The wreck of Spee's flagship Scharnhorst was found off the Falklands on 5 December 2019, almost 105 years to the day after her sinking. Wilhelm Graf von Spee, head of the Graf von Spee family, called the location of the wreck "bittersweet", remarking that the family took comfort "from the knowledge that the final resting place of so many has been found, and can now be preserved, whilst also being reminded of the huge waste of life. As a family, we lost a father and his two sons on one day. Like the thousands of other families who suffered an unimaginable loss during the First World War, we remember them and must ensure that their sacrifice was not in vain."
