= HMS Essex (1901) =

1901 British Monmouth-class armoured cruiser

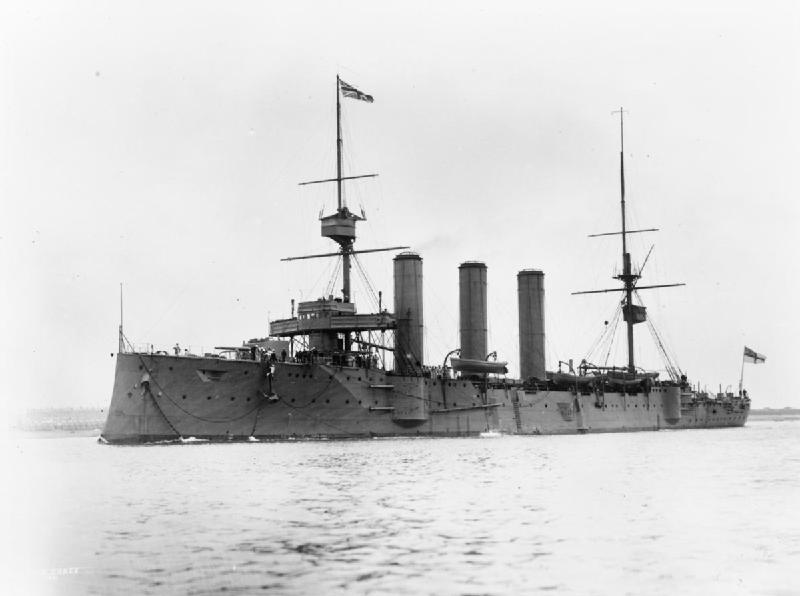
- Essex at anchor

History

United Kingdom
- Name: Essex
- Namesake: Essex
- Builder: HM Dockyard, Pembroke, Wales
- Laid down: 2 January 1900
- Launched: 29 August 1901
- Completed: 22 March 1904
- Fate: Sold for scrap, 8 November 1921

General characteristics
- Class & type: Monmouth-class armoured cruiser
- Displacement: 9,800 long tons (10,000 t) (normal)
- Length: 463 ft 6 in (141.3 m) (o/a)
- Beam: 66 ft (20.1 m)
- Draught: 25 ft (7.6 m)
- Installed power: 31 water-tube boilers; 22,000 ihp (16,000 kW)
- Propulsion: 2 × shafts; 2 × triple-expansion steam engines
- Speed: 23 knots (43 km/h; 26 mph)
- Complement: 678
- Armament: 2 × twin, 10 × single 6 in (152 mm) guns; 10 × single 12-pdr (3 in (76 mm)) guns; 3 × single 3-pdr (1.9 in (47 mm)) guns; 2 × 18 in (450 mm) torpedo tubes
- Armour: Belt: 2–4 in (51–102 mm); Decks: 0.75–2 in (19–51 mm); Barbettes: 4 in (102 mm); Turrets: 4 in (102 mm); Conning tower: 10 in (254 mm)

HMS Essex was one of 10 Monmouth-class armoured cruisers built for the Royal Navy in the first decade of the 20th century. Upon completion in 1904 she was assigned to the 2nd Cruiser Squadron of the Channel Fleet. The ship was placed in reserve in March 1906 and recommissioned in 1909 for service with the 4th Cruiser Squadron on the North America and West Indies Station. In 1912, Essex returned home and was assigned to the Training Squadron of the Home Fleet. After a refit the following year, she rejoined the 4th Cruiser Squadron in early 1914.

After the beginning of World War I in August, the ship captured a German merchantman the following month. Essex spent most of the first half of the war in the Atlantic Ocean, escorting convoys and searching for German commerce raiders. The ship captured another German merchantman in mid-1916 and was reduced to second-line roles such as depot ship and accommodation ship a few months later. She was paid off in 1919 and sold for scrap two years later.

== Design and description ==
The Monmouths were intended to protect British merchant shipping from fast cruisers like the French Guichen, Châteaurenault or the Dupleix class. The ships were designed to displace 9,800 long tons (10,000 t). They had an overall length of 463 feet 6 inches (141.3 m), a beam of 66 feet (20.1 m) and a deep draught of 25 feet (7.6 m). They were powered by two 4-cylinder triple-expansion steam engines, each driving one shaft using steam provided by 31 Belleville boilers. The engines produced a total of 22,000 indicated horsepower (16,000 kW) which was designed to give the ships a maximum speed of 23 knots (43 km/h; 26 mph). Essex, however, was one of three of the Monmouths that failed to meet her designed speed. She carried a maximum of 1,600 long tons (1,600 t) of coal and her complement consisted of 678 officers and ratings.

The Monmouth-class ships' main armament consisted of fourteen breech-loading (BL) 6-inch (152 mm) Mk VII guns. Four of these guns were mounted in two twin-gun turrets, one each fore and aft of the superstructure, and the others were positioned in casemates amidships. Six of these were mounted on the main deck and were only usable in calm weather. Ten quick-firing (QF) 12-pounder (3-inch (76 mm)) 12-cwt guns (Note: "Cwt" is the abbreviation for hundredweight, 12 cwt referring to the weight of the gun.) were fitted for defence against torpedo boats. Essex also carried three 3-pounder 1.9 in (47 mm) Hotchkiss guns and two submerged 18-inch (450 mm) torpedo tubes.

Beginning in 1915, the main deck six-inch guns of the Monmouth-class ships were moved to the upper deck and given gun shields. Their casemates were plated over to improve seakeeping. The twelve-pounder guns displaced by the transfer were repositioned elsewhere. At some point in the war, a pair of three-pounder anti-aircraft guns were installed on the upper deck.

The ship's waterline armour belt was four inches (102 mm) thick amidships and two-inch (51 mm) forward. The armour of the gun turrets, their barbettes and the casemates was four inches thick. The protective deck armour ranged in thickness from 0.75–2 inches (19–51 mm) and the conning tower was protected by ten inches (254 mm) of armour.

== Construction and service ==
Essex, named to commemorate the English county, was laid down at Pembroke Royal Dockyard, Wales, on 2 January 1900 and launched on 29 August 1901, when she was christened by Mrs. Charles Barlow, wife of the Captain-Superintendent of the dockyard. There was no dry dock at Pembroke large enough to accommodated Essex, and she was therefore sent to Devonport Dockyard in late 1902 for further for fitting-out. Her torpedo tubes were manufactured at Devonport and thus not installed until she arrived there. The ship was completed on 22 March 1904 and was initially assigned to the 2nd Cruiser Squadron of the Channel Fleet. Essex was placed in reserve in March 1906 and suffered a six-inch gun explosion in July while training. She was recommissioned in September 1909 and assigned to the 4th Cruiser Squadron on the North America and West Indies Station. She was transferred to the Home Fleet Training Squadron in 1912 and refitted the following year. Essex rejoined the 4th Cruiser Squadron in January 1914 with Commander Hugh Tweedie in command.

After visiting Madeira and Jamaica, the ship arrived in Veracruz, Mexico, on 9 February to relieve her sister ship, Suffolk, and protect British interests during the ongoing Mexican Revolution. Two weeks later, she visited Galveston, Texas, before heading for Tampico, Mexico, where she arrived on 11 March. Essex only spent a few days there before returning to Veracruz on 13 March. She was in Tampico when Mexican soldiers briefly detained American sailors buying petrol for their ship on 9 April (the Tampico Affair) and returned to Veracruz ten days later, two days before the Americans began landing there on 21 April. They were not satisfied by the Mexican apologies and U.S. President Woodrow Wilson ordered the city occupied in retribution and to forestall a major arms delivery to Victoriano Huerta's forces. The Mexicans resisted and stray bullets hit Essex the next day, wounding one man who was shot in both feet. Tweedie, escorted by two ratings, was sent to take dispatches for the British Minister in Mexico City on the 26th and returned two days later. Rear-Admiral Christopher Craddock inspected the ship and her crew on 5–6 May. Essex sailed for Tampico on 10 May before leaving Mexican waters on the 14th. A month later, the ship was in Quebec City when she was visited by the Canadian Minister of Marine and Fisheries on 16 June. The following month, Essex ferried the Governor General of Canada, Prince Arthur, Duke of Connaught and Strathearn, to Newfoundland and Labrador before returning to Quebec City on 20 July.

=== World War I ===
When Craddock received the preliminary war warning on 27 July, he ordered Essex to join her sister Lancaster in Bermuda, which she reached three days later. The ship was ordered to patrol the area north and northwest to protect British shipping and destroy any German commerce raiders. As the Germans appeared to be concentrating their efforts in the Caribbean, Craddock ordered Essex south to reinforce his forces there in early September. On 7 September, she captured the tender, SS Bethania, for the armed merchant cruiser SS Kaiser Wilhelm der Grosse, en route from Halifax to Jamaica. The ship continued to patrol the sealanes from the Caribbean Sea to Canadian waters until the end of February 1915, when she escorted a troop convoy from Halifax to Queenstown, Ireland. Essex then sailed to Barrow-in-Furness where she began a refit that lasted until 29 April. Now assigned to the 7th Cruiser Squadron of the Grand Fleet, she spent the next several weeks in Avonmouth or Scapa Flow before being transferred to Cruiser Force I and began patrolling the area between the Azores, Madeira, Cape Verde and Gibraltar on 8 June. Rear-Admiral Archibald Moore, commander of the 9th Cruiser Squadron, hoisted his flag aboard the ship on 4 September and pulled it down on the 29th. Essex began a brief refit at Gibraltar on 1 October that lasted until the 26th and then resumed patrolling the Central Atlantic. She captured a German merchantman, SS Telde, on 3 May 1916 in the Canary Islands. The ship resumed patrolling until her arrival in Devonport on 17 August; Essex was paid off days later.

Later in the year, she was recommissioned and served as a destroyer depot ship at Devonport. By April 1918, Essex was an accommodation ship there. As of 1 December, she was serving as a training ship, but she reverted to her previous role as an accommodation ship by 1 May 1919. Essex was paid off again by October 1919 and was later sold for scrap on 8 November 1921 and broken up in Germany.

== Bibliography ==
- Corbett, Julian (1997) [1938]. Naval Operations to the Battle of the Falklands. History of the Great War: Based on Official Documents. Vol. I: To the Battle of the Falklands December 1914 (Second ed.). London and Nashville, Tennessee: Imperial War Museum and Battery Press. ISBN 0-89839-256-X.
- Corbett, Julian (1997) [1929]. Naval Operations. History of the Great War: Based on Official Documents. Vol. II (Second ed.). London and Nashville, Tennessee: Imperial War Museum in association with the Battery Press. ISBN 1-870423-74-7.
- Corbett, Julian (1997) [1940]. Naval Operations. History of the Great War: Based on Official Documents. Vol. III (Second ed.). London and Nashville, Tennessee: Imperial War Museum in association with the Battery Press. ISBN 1-870423-50-X.
- Friedman, Norman (2012). British Cruisers of the Victorian Era. Barnsley, UK: Seaforth Publishing. ISBN 978-1-59114-068-9.
- Friedman, Norman (2011). Naval Weapons of World War One: Guns, Torpedoes, Mines and ASW Weapons of All Nations; An Illustrated Directory. Barnsley, UK: Seaforth Publishing. ISBN 978-1-84832-100-7.
- Massie, Robert K. (2003). Castles of Steel: Britain, Germany, and the Winning of the Great War at Sea. New York: Random House. ISBN 0-679-45671-6.
- McBride, Keith (1988). "The First County Class Cruisers of the Royal Navy, Part I: The Monmouths". Warship. 46 (April). London: Conway Maritime Press: 19–26. ISSN 0142-6222.
- O'Shaughnessy, Edith (1916). A Diplomat's Wife in Mexico. New York: Harper & Brothers Publishers.
- Preston, Antony (1985). "Great Britain and Empire Forces". In Gray, Randal (ed.). Conway's All the World's Fighting Ships 1906–1921. Annapolis, Maryland: Naval Institute Press. pp. 1–104. ISBN 0-85177-245-5.
- Roberts, John (1979). "Great Britain and Empire Forces". In Chesneau, Roger & Kolesnik, Eugene M. (eds.). Conway's All the World's Fighting Ships 1860-1905. Greenwich, UK: Conway Maritime Press. pp. 1–113. ISBN 0-8317-0302-4.
- Silverstone, Paul H. (1984). Directory of the World's Capital Ships. New York: Hippocrene Books. ISBN 0-88254-979-0.
- "Transcript: HMS Essex - January 1914 to August 1916, 4th Cruiser Squadron West Atlantic, North America & West Indies Station, 9th Cruiser Squadron Atlantic (Canary Islands)". Royal Navy Log Books of the World War 1 Era. Naval-History.net.
