= Monmouth-class cruiser =

British warship class (1903–1921)

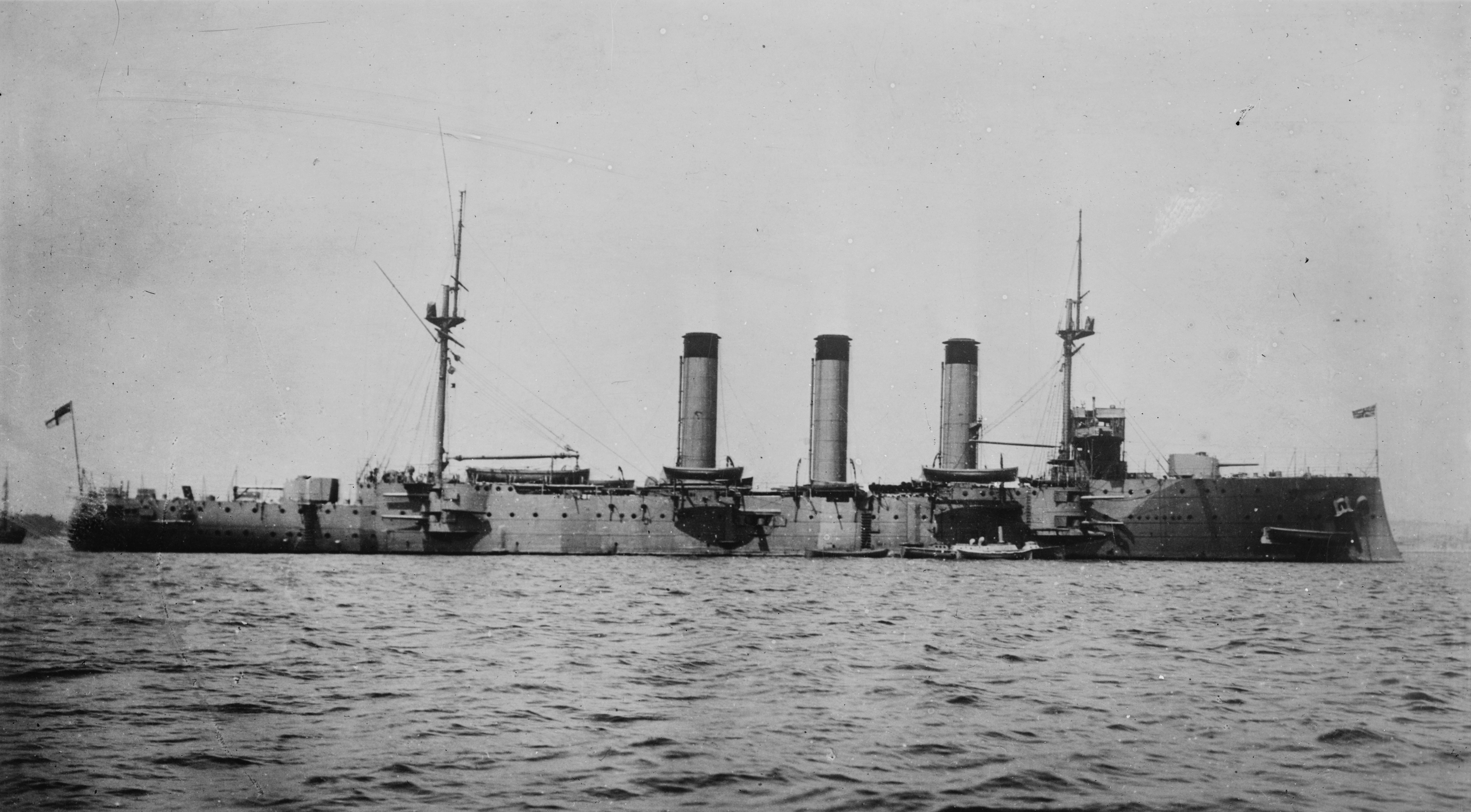
- Suffolk

Class overview
- Name: Monmouth class
- Builders: Fairfield Shipbuilding (2); London & Glasgow (2); Pembroke Dockyard (2); Portsmouth Dockyard (2); Armstrong Whitworth (1); William Beardmore (1)
- Operators: Royal Navy
- Preceded by: Drake class
- Succeeded by: Devonshire class
- Built: 1899–1904
- In commission: 1903–1921
- Completed: 10
- Lost: 2
- Scrapped: 8

General characteristics
- Type: Armoured cruiser
- Displacement: 9,800 long tons (10,000 t) (normal)
- Length: 463 ft 6 in (141.3 m) (o/a)
- Beam: 66 ft (20.1 m)
- Draught: 25 ft (7.6 m)
- Installed power: 31 water-tube boilers; 22,000 ihp (16,000 kW)
- Propulsion: 2 × shafts; 2 × triple-expansion steam engines
- Speed: 23 knots (43 km/h; 26 mph)
- Complement: 678
- Armament: 2 × twin, 10 × single 6 in (152 mm) guns; 10 × single 12-pdr (3 in (76 mm)) guns; 3 × single 3-pdr (1.9 in (47 mm)) guns; 2 × 18 in (450 mm) torpedo tubes
- Armour: Belt: 2–4 in (51–102 mm); Decks: 0.75–2 in (19–51 mm); Barbettes: 4 in (102 mm); Turrets: 4 in (102 mm); Conning tower: 10 in (254 mm)

The Monmouth class was a ten-ship class of 10,000-ton armoured cruisers built around 1901 to 1903 for the Royal Navy and designed specifically for commerce protection. The ships were also referred to as County class cruisers as they carried the names of British counties.

== Design ==
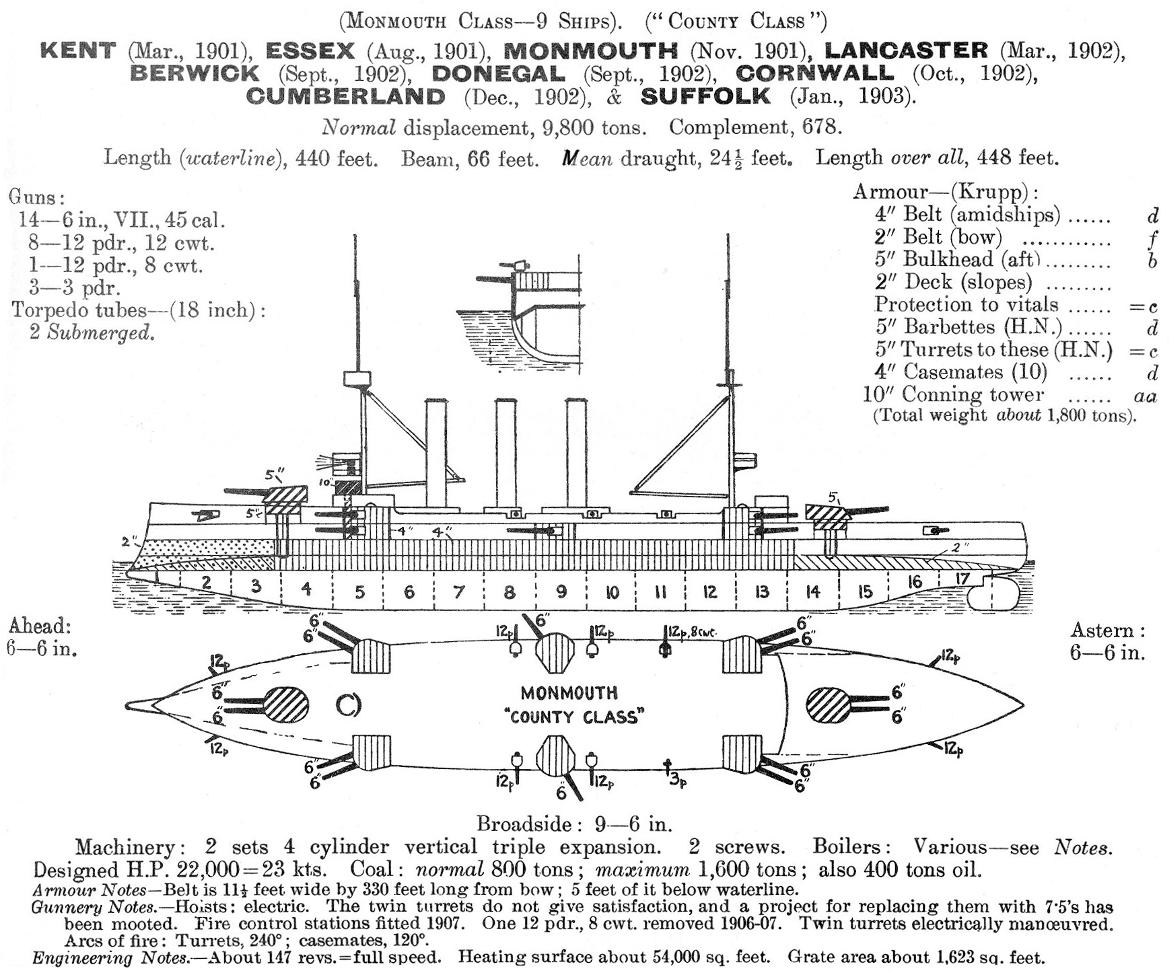
Left elevation and deck plan as depicted in Jane's Fighting Ships 1914

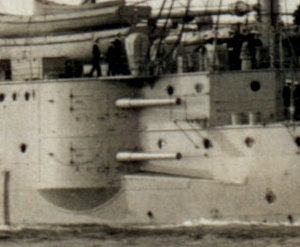
Aft port casemate guns on Berwick, illustrating the unfortunate positioning

Expected only to fight light cruisers and armed merchant ships, the class was armed with fourteen 6-inch guns at a time when most British armoured cruisers also carried at least a pair of 9.2-inch guns: Four of the guns were mounted in two twin turrets at a good height, the remaining ten were installed in hull-mounted casemates, five on each side. The lower casemate guns were just a few feet above water, making them impossible to use in heavy seas. Sir John Fisher commented that "Sir William White designed the County class but forgot the guns." On the other hand, they were relatively fast ships for their time.

== Ships ==
The following table gives the build details and purchase cost of the members of the Monmouth class. Standard British practice at that time was for these costs to exclude armament and stores. The compilers of The Naval Annual revised costs quoted for British ships between the 1905 and 1906 editions. The reasons for the differences are unclear.

Construction data
Ship	Builder	Date of			Cost according to	
Ship	Builder	Laid down	Launch	Completion	(BNA 1905)	(BNA 1906)
Monmouth	London & Glasgow Shipbuilding, Govan	29 Aug 1899	13 Nov 1901	2 Dec 1903	£709,085	£979,591
Bedford	Fairfield Shipping and Engineering, Govan	19 Feb 1900	31 Aug 1901	11 Nov 1903	£734,330	£706,020
Essex	HM Dockyard, Pembroke	1 Jan 1900	29 Aug 1901	22 Mar 1903	£770,325	£736,557
Kent	HM Dockyard, Portsmouth	12 Feb 1900	6 Mar 1901	1 Oct 1903	£733,940	£700,283
Berwick	William Beardmore and Company	19 Apr 1901	20 Sep 1902	9 Dec 1903	£776,868	£750,984
Cornwall	HM Dockyard, Pembroke	11 Mar 1901	29 Oct 1902	1 Dec 1904	£789,421	£756,274
Cumberland	London & Glasgow Shipbuilding, Govan	19 Feb 1901	16 Dec 1902	1 Dec 1904	£751,508	£718,168
Donegal	Fairfield Shipping and Engineering, Govan	14 Feb 1901	4 Sep 1902	5 Nov 1903	£752,964	£715,947
Lancaster	Armstrong-Whitworth, Elswick	4 Mar 1901	22 Mar 1903	5 Apr 1904	£763,084	£732,858
Suffolk	HM Dockyard, Portsmouth	25 Mar 1901	15 Jan 1903	21 May 1904	£783,054	£722,681

== Service ==
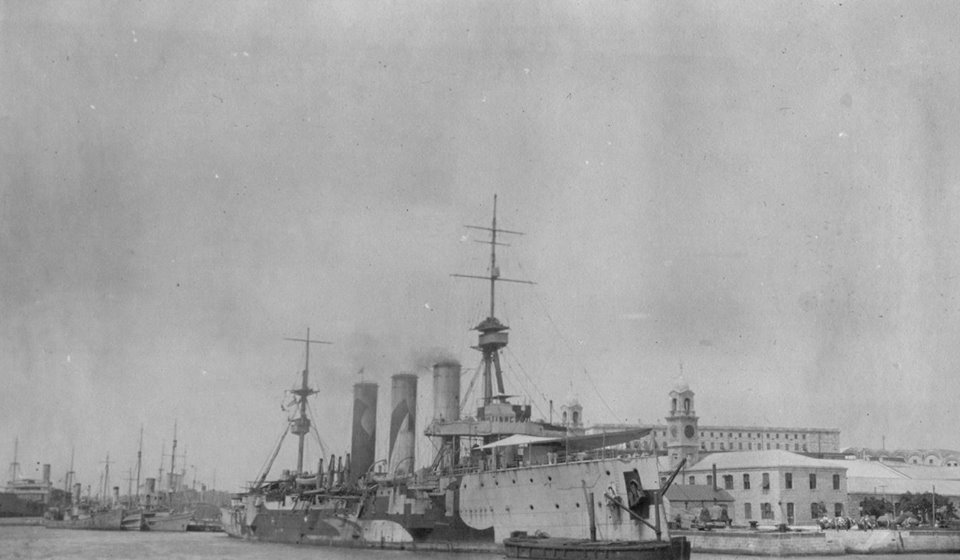
HMS Donegal at the Royal Naval Dockyard in the Imperial fortress colony of Bermuda circa 1918.

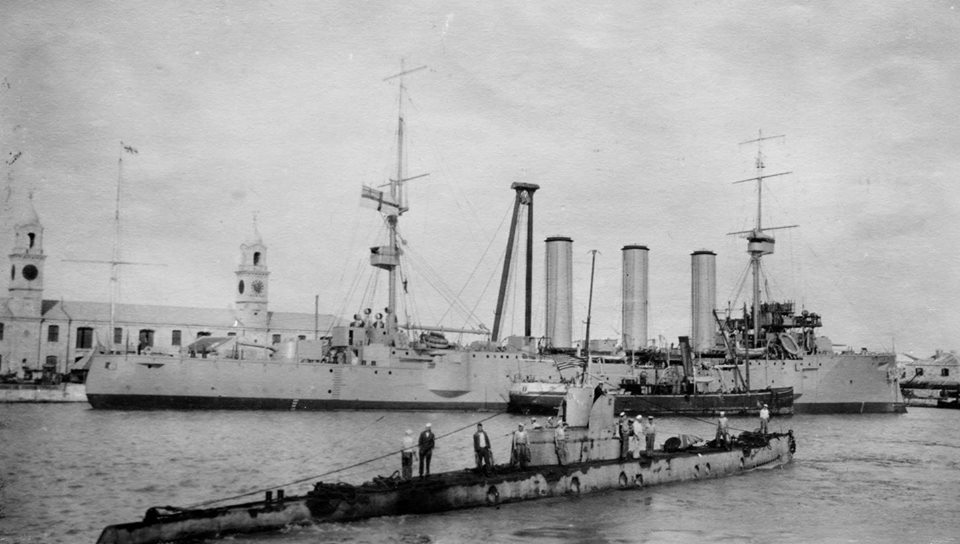
HMS Cornwall at the Royal Naval Dockyard in Bermuda circa 1918

Upon completion, the ships served briefly in home waters before being assigned to various oversea stations (the China Station and the North America and West Indies Station). During this time HMS Bedford was wrecked in the East China Sea in 1910 and scrapped.

Following the outbreak of World War I, the ships were primarily tasked with combating German commerce raiders, patrolling in both the North and South Atlantic. HMS Monmouth was assigned to Rear Admiral Sir Christopher Cradock's squadron, and was sunk at the Battle of Coronel in November 1914. HMS Kent was also assigned to Cradock's squadron, but failed to join in time; she remained at the Falkland Islands and joined Vice-Admiral Doveton Sturdee's squadron, which also included HMS Cornwall. In the ensuing Battle of the Falklands in December 1914, HMS Kent pursued and sank the light cruiser Nürnberg, while HMS Cornwall pursued and sank the light cruiser Leipzig. HMS Kent continued the pursuit of the light cruiser Dresden, eventually locating her and forcing her to be scuttled at the Battle of Más a Tierra. In 1915, HMS Cornwall participated in the blockade of the light cruiser Königsberg in the Rufiji River.

After World War I, several of the ships served briefly as training ships. All soon were withdrawn from service and scrapped in 1920 and 1921.

== Bibliography ==
- Brassey, T.A. (ed) The Naval Annual 1905
- Corbett, Julian (1997) [1938]. Naval Operations to the Battle of the Falklands. History of the Great War: Based on Official Documents. Vol. I (2nd ed.). London and Nashville, Tennessee: Imperial War Museum and Battery Press. ISBN 0-89839-256-X.
- Friedman, Norman (2012). British Cruisers of the Victorian Era. Barnsley, UK: Seaforth. ISBN 978-1-59114-068-9.
- Friedman, Norman (2011). Naval Weapons of World War One: Guns, Torpedoes, Mines and ASW Weapons of All Nations; An Illustrated Directory. Barnsley, UK: Seaforth Publishing. ISBN 978-1-84832-100-7.
- Leyland, J. and Brassey, T.A. (ed) The Naval Annual 1906
- Massie, Robert K. (2003). Castles of Steel: Britain, Germany, and the Winning of the Great War at Sea. New York: Random House. ISBN 0-679-45671-6.
- McBride, K. D. (1998). "Re: HMS Kent (1914–1915)". Warship International. XXXV (4): 334–341. ISSN 0043-0374.
- Preston, Antony (1985). "Great Britain and Empire Forces". In Gray, Randal (ed.). Conway's All the World's Fighting Ships 1906–1921. Annapolis, Maryland: Naval Institute Press. pp. 1–104. ISBN 0-85177-245-5.
- Silverstone, Paul H. (1984). Directory of the World's Capital Ships. New York: Hippocrene Books. ISBN 0-88254-979-0.
