= HMS Lancaster (1902) =

Cruiser of the Royal Navy

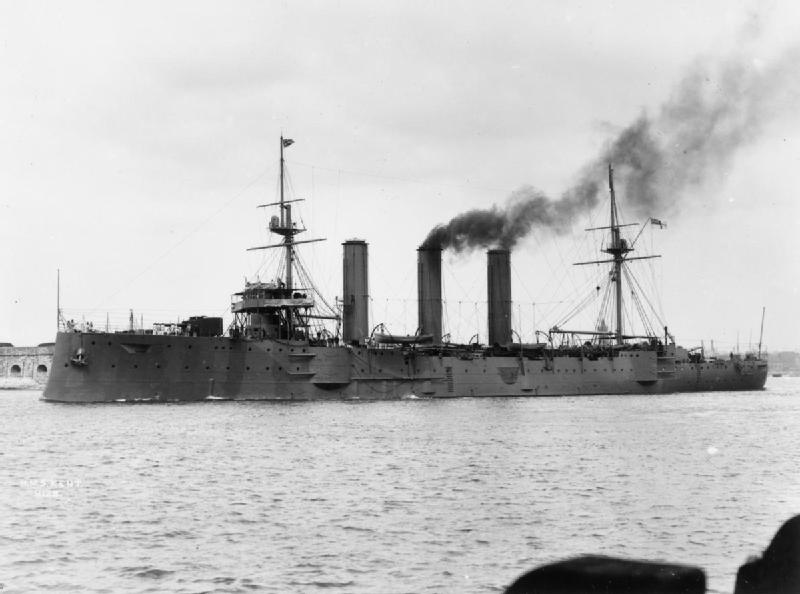
- Lancaster's sister ship Kent

History

United Kingdom
- Name: Lancaster
- Namesake: Lancashire
- Builder: Armstrong Whitworth, Elswick
- Laid down: 4 March 1901
- Launched: 22 March 1902
- Christened: Mrs. Douglas
- Completed: 5 April 1904
- Fate: Sold for scrap, 3 March 1920

General characteristics
- Class & type: Monmouth-class armoured cruiser
- Displacement: 9,800 long tons (10,000 t) (normal)
- Length: 463 ft 6 in (141.3 m) (o/a)
- Beam: 66 ft (20.1 m)
- Draught: 25 ft (7.6 m)
- Installed power: 31 water-tube boilers; 22,000 ihp (16,000 kW)
- Propulsion: 2 × shafts; 2 × triple-expansion steam engines
- Speed: 23 knots (43 km/h; 26 mph)
- Complement: 678
- Armament: 2 × twin, 10 × single 6 in (152 mm) guns; 10 × single 12-pdr (3 in (76 mm)) guns; 3 × single 3-pdr (1.9 in (47 mm)) guns; 2 × 18 in (450 mm) torpedo tubes
- Armour: Belt: 2–4 in (51–102 mm); Decks: 0.75–2 in (19–51 mm); Barbettes: 4 in (102 mm); Turrets: 4 in (102 mm); Conning tower: 10 in (254 mm)

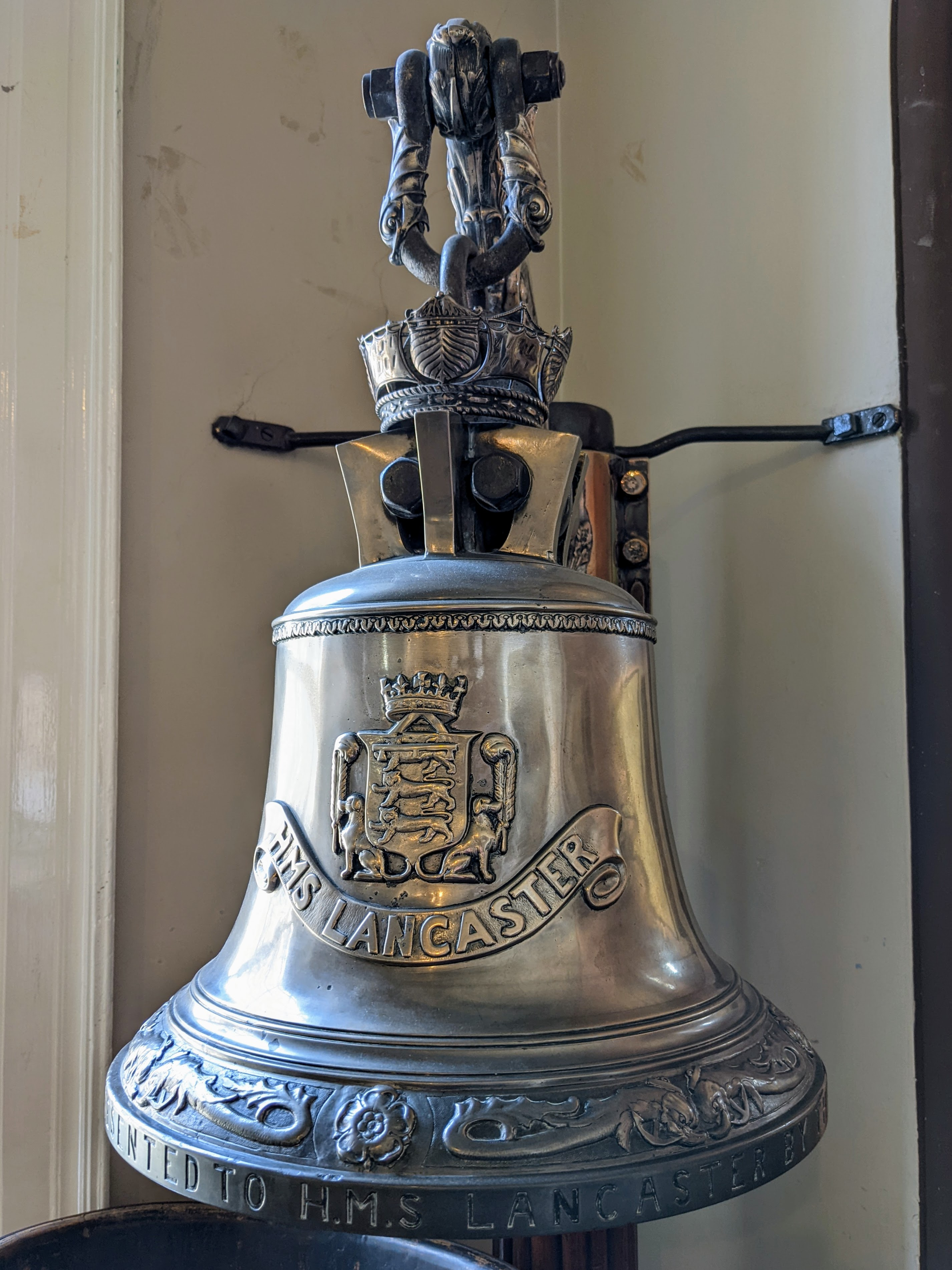
Ship's bell from Lancaster in Lancaster City Museum

HMS Lancaster was one of 10 Monmouth-class armoured cruisers built for the Royal Navy in the first decade of the 20th century. Upon completion she was assigned to the 3rd Cruiser Squadron of the Mediterranean Fleet. She remained there until 1912 when she returned home to be placed in reserve. The ship was recommissioned in 1913 for service with the 4th Cruiser Squadron on the North America and West Indies Station. She remained there until she was assigned to the Grand Fleet in 1915. She was transferred to the Pacific in 1916 and she became flagship of the Eastern Squadron in 1918. The ship was sold for scrap in 1920.

== Design and description ==
The Monmouths were intended to protect British merchant shipping from fast cruisers like the French Guichen, Châteaurenault or the Dupleix class. The ships were designed to displace 9,800 long tons (10,000 t). They had an overall length of 463 feet 6 inches (141.3 m), a beam of 66 feet (20.1 m) and a deep draught of 25 feet (7.6 m). They were powered by two 4-cylinder triple-expansion steam engines, each driving one shaft using steam provided by 31 Belleville boilers. The engines produced a total of 22,000 indicated horsepower (16,000 kW) which was designed to give the ships a maximum speed of 23 knots (43 km/h; 26 mph). Lancaster, however, reached 24 knots (44 km/h; 28 mph) during her sea trials. She carried a maximum of 1,600 long tons (1,600 t) of coal and her complement consisted of 678 officers and ratings.

The Monmouth-class ships' main armament consisted of fourteen breech-loading (BL) 6-inch (152 mm) Mk VII guns. Four of these guns were mounted in two twin-gun turrets, one each fore and aft of the superstructure, and the others were positioned in casemates amidships. Six of these were mounted on the main deck and were only usable in calm weather. Ten quick-firing (QF) 12-pounder (3-inch (76 mm)) 12-cwt guns (Note: "Cwt" is the abbreviation for hundredweight, 12 cwt referring to the weight of the gun.) were fitted for defence against torpedo boats. Lancaster also carried three 3-pounder 1.9 in (47 mm) Hotchkiss guns and two submerged 18-inch (450 mm) torpedo tubes.

Beginning in 1915, the main deck six-inch guns of the Monmouth-class ships were moved to the upper deck and given gun shields. Their casemates were plated over to improve seakeeping. The twelve-pounder guns displaced by the transfer were repositioned elsewhere. At some point in the war, a pair of three-pounder anti-aircraft guns were installed on the upper deck.

The ship's waterline armour belt was four inches (102 mm) thick amidships and two-inch (51 mm) forward. The armour of the gun turrets, their barbettes and the casemates was four inches thick. The protective deck armour ranged in thickness from 0.75–2 inches (19–51 mm) and the conning tower was protected by ten inches (254 mm) of armour.

== Construction and service ==
Lancaster, named for the English county, was laid down by Armstrong Whitworth at their shipyard in Elswick on 4 March 1901 and launched on 22 March 1902, when she was christened by Mrs. Douglas, wife of Vice-Admiral A. L. Douglas, Second Naval Lord. She was completed on 5 April 1904 and was initially assigned to the 3rd Cruiser Squadron of the Mediterranean Fleet. She remained with the squadron after it was redesignated as the 6th Cruiser Squadron, not returning home until 1912 when she was assigned to the reserve 5th Cruiser Squadron. The following year Lancaster was recommissioned and assigned to the 4th Cruiser Squadron on the North America and West Indies Station.

After the beginning of World War I in August 1914, she searched for German commerce raiders and protected convoys until she returned home to join the 7th Cruiser Squadron of the Grand Fleet in 1915. She was transferred to the Pacific in April 1916 and became flagship of the Eastern Squadron in 1918. Lancaster was partially dismantled in Birkenhead before she was sold for scrap on 3 March 1920 and subsequently broken up in Blyth.

Her twin 6” guns are now on display outside the Historic Dockyard Museum in Stanley, Falkland Islands

== Bibliography ==
- Corbett, Julian (1997) [1938]. Naval Operations to the Battle of the Falklands. History of the Great War: Based on Official Documents. Vol. I (2nd ed.). London and Nashville, Tennessee: Imperial War Museum and Battery Press. ISBN 0-89839-256-X.
- Friedman, Norman (2012). British Cruisers of the Victorian Era. Barnsley, UK: Seaforth. ISBN 978-1-59114-068-9.
- Friedman, Norman (2011). Naval Weapons of World War One: Guns, Torpedoes, Mines and ASW Weapons of All Nations; An Illustrated Directory. Barnsley, UK: Seaforth Publishing. ISBN 978-1-84832-100-7.
- Massie, Robert K. (2003). Castles of Steel: Britain, Germany, and the Winning of the Great War at Sea. New York: Random House. ISBN 0-679-45671-6.
- McBride, Keith (1988). "The First County Class Cruisers of the Royal Navy, Part I: The Monmouths". Warship. 46 (April). London: Conway Maritime Press: 19–26. ISSN 0142-6222.
- Preston, Antony (1985). "Great Britain and Empire Forces". In Gray, Randal (ed.). Conway's All the World's Fighting Ships 1906–1921. Annapolis, Maryland: Naval Institute Press. pp. 1–104. ISBN 0-85177-245-5.
- Roberts, John (1979). "Great Britain and Empire Forces". In Chesneau, Roger & Kolesnik, Eugene M. (eds.). Conway's All the World's Fighting Ships 1860-1905. Greenwich, UK: Conway Maritime Press. pp. 1–113. ISBN 0-8317-0302-4.
- Silverstone, Paul H. (1984). Directory of the World's Capital Ships. New York: Hippocrene Books. ISBN 0-88254-979-0.
- "Transcript: HMS Lancaster - September 1913 to March 1915, UK out, 4th Cruiser Squadron West Indies, North America and West Indies Station (Part 1 of 3)". Royal Navy Log Books of the World War 1 Era. Naval-History.net.
