= HMS Kent (1901) =

Monmouth-class armoured cruiser finished in 1903

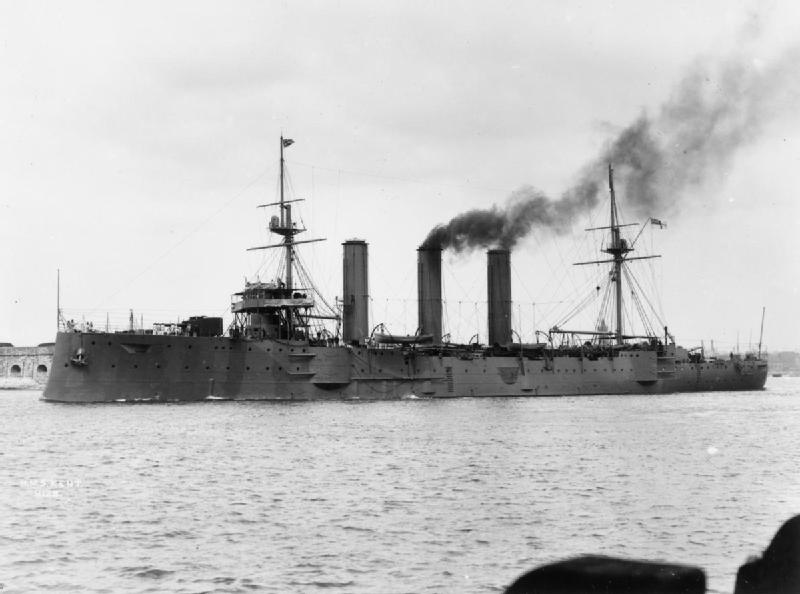
- Kent leaving Portsmouth, 1903

History

United Kingdom
- Name: Kent
- Namesake: Kent
- Builder: Portsmouth Royal Dockyard
- Laid down: 12 February 1900
- Launched: 6 March 1901
- Christened: Lady Hotham
- Completed: 1 October 1903
- Fate: Sold for scrap, 20 June 1920

General characteristics
- Class & type: Monmouth-class armoured cruiser
- Displacement: 9,800 long tons (10,000 t) (normal)
- Length: 463 ft 6 in (141.3 m) (o/a)
- Beam: 66 ft (20.1 m)
- Draught: 25 ft (7.6 m)
- Installed power: 31 water-tube boilers; 22,000 ihp (16,000 kW)
- Propulsion: 2 × shafts; 2 × triple-expansion steam engines
- Speed: 23 knots (43 km/h; 26 mph)
- Complement: 678
- Armament: 2 × twin, 10 × single 6 in (152 mm) guns; 10 × single 12-pdr (3 in (76 mm)) guns; 3 × single 3-pdr (1.9 in (47 mm)) guns; 2 × 18 in (450 mm) torpedo tubes
- Armour: Belt: 2–4 in (51–102 mm); Decks: 0.75–2 in (19–51 mm); Barbettes: 4 in (102 mm); Turrets: 4 in (102 mm); Conning tower: 10 in (254 mm)

HMS Kent was one of 10 Monmouth-class armoured cruisers built for the Royal Navy in the first decade of the 20th century. She was placed in reserve when completed in 1903, but was recommissioned for the China Station in 1906. She remained there until she returned home in 1913 for a lengthy refit.

At the beginning of World War I in August 1914, she was still refitting. In October Kent was ordered to the South Atlantic to join Rear-Admiral Christopher Cradock's squadron in their search for the German East Asia Squadron, but arrived at the Falkland Islands after the British squadron had been destroyed in the Battle of Coronel. During the subsequent Battle of the Falkland Islands at the end of 1914, the ship sank the German light cruiser Nürnberg. Several months later she discovered the sole surviving German ship from that battle and forced the light cruiser Dresden to scuttle herself in the Battle of Más a Tierra. She was assigned to patrol the South American coast for the rest of 1915, but was transferred to the Cape Station in early 1916 to begin convoy escort duties along the West African coast until mid-1918 when she returned to the China Station. In early 1919 the ship was deployed to Vladivostok to support the Siberian Intervention against the Bolsheviks during the Russian Civil War. She did little militarily there, although she contributed some crewmen to man gunboats supporting the Whites opposing the Bolsheviks. Kent was sold for scrap in China in 1920.

== Design and description ==
The Monmouths were intended to protect British merchant shipping from fast cruisers like the French Guichen, Châteaurenault or the Dupleix class. The ships were designed to displace 9,800 long tons (10,000 t). They had an overall length of 463 feet 6 inches (141.3 m), a beam of 66 feet (20.1 m) and a deep draught of 25 feet (7.6 m). They were powered by two 4-cylinder triple-expansion steam engines, each driving one shaft using steam provided by 31 Belleville boilers. The engines produced a total of 22,000 indicated horsepower (16,000 kW) which was designed to give the ships a maximum speed of 23 knots (43 km/h; 26 mph). Kent, however, was one of three of the Monmouths that failed to meet her designed speed. She carried a maximum of 1,600 long tons (1,600 t) of coal and her complement consisted of 678 officers and ratings.

The Monmouth-class ships' main armament consisted of fourteen breech-loading (BL) 6-inch (152 mm) Mk VII guns. Four of these guns were mounted in two twin-gun turrets, one each fore and aft of the superstructure, and the others were positioned in casemates amidships. Six of these were mounted on the main deck and were only usable in calm weather. Ten quick-firing (QF) 12-pounder (3-inch (76 mm)) 12-cwt guns (Note: "Cwt" is the abbreviation for hundredweight, 12 cwt referring to the weight of the gun.) were fitted for defence against torpedo boats. Kent also carried three 3-pounder 1.9 in (47 mm) Hotchkiss guns and two submerged 18-inch (450 mm) torpedo tubes.

Beginning in 1915, the main deck six-inch guns of the Monmouth-class ships were moved to the upper deck and given gun shields. Their casemates were plated over to improve seakeeping. The twelve-pounder guns displaced by the transfer were repositioned elsewhere. At some point in the war, a pair of three-pounder anti-aircraft guns were installed on the upper deck.

The ship's waterline armour belt was four inches (102 mm) thick amidships and two-inch (51 mm) forward. The armour of the gun turrets, their barbettes and the casemates was four inches thick. The protective deck armour ranged in thickness from 0.75–2 inches (19–51 mm) and the conning tower was protected by ten inches (254 mm) of armour.

== Construction and service ==
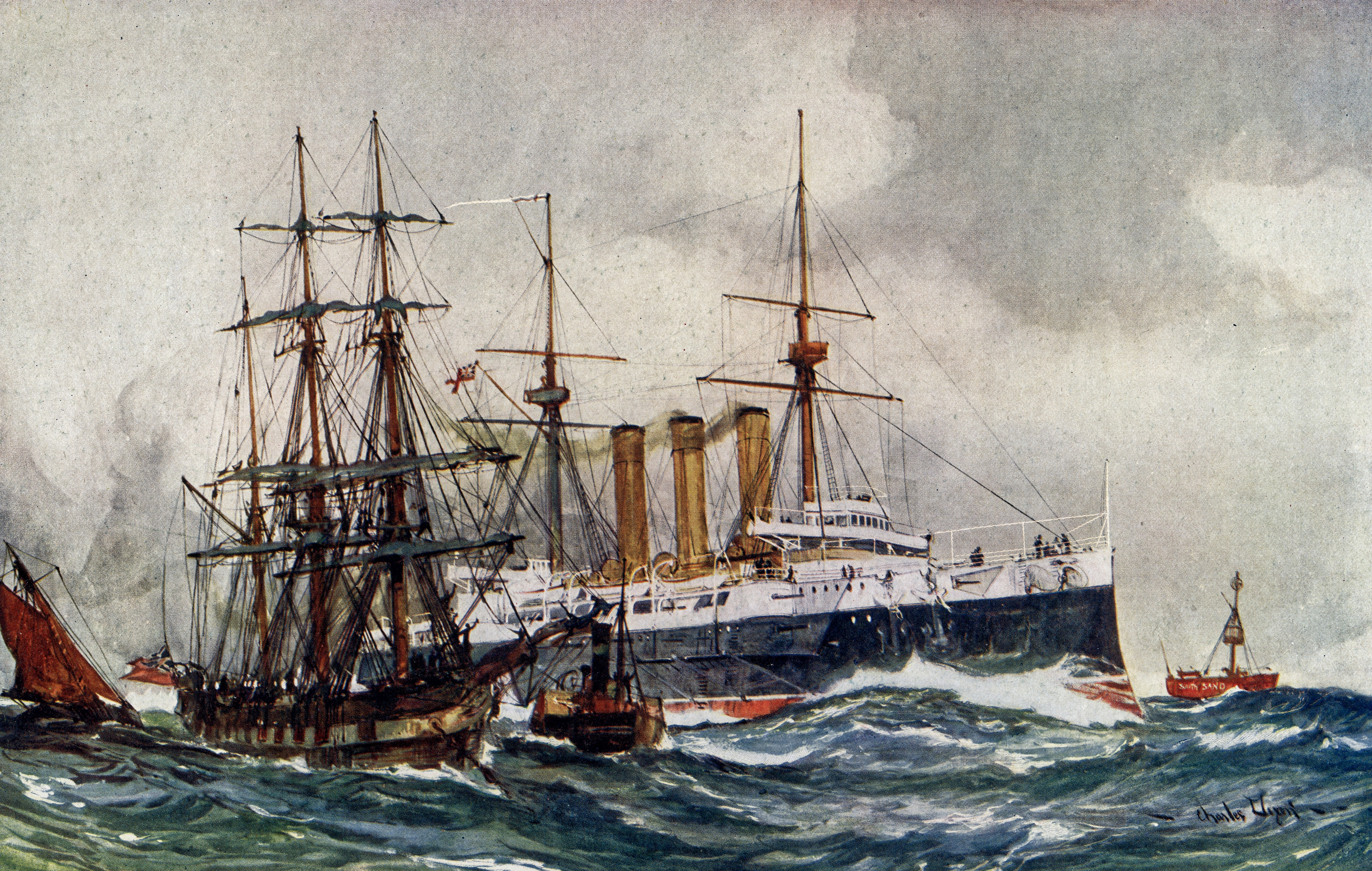
Kent Passing South Sand Lightship

Kent, named to commemorate the English county, was laid down at Portsmouth Royal Dockyard on 12 February 1900 and launched on 6 March 1901 (one day late due to weather), when she was christened by Lady Hotham, wife of Admiral Sir Charles Frederick Hotham, GCB, Commander-in-Chief, Portsmouth. She was completed on 1 October 1903 and was initially placed in reserve. On 15 March 1905 she ran aground in the Firth of Forth. The ship was assigned to the China Station between 1906 and 1913 and returned to Portsmouth Dockyard for a refit in September 1913.

She was still refitting in August 1914 when the war began and was ordered south to join Cradock's squadron searching for the East Asia Squadron after completing her sea trials in October. Kent, however, was diverted en route to hunt for the German light cruiser Karlsruhe in the Cape Verde – Canary Islands area. When the news of the disastrous Battle of Coronel reached the Admiralty in early November, she was at Freetown, Sierra Leone, and was ordered to resume her original mission. She reached the Abrolhos Archipelago where she was to rendezvous with Rear-Admiral Archibald Stoddart's force. While awaiting them, she patrolled the coast down to Montevideo, Uruguay, and fired her six-inch guns at targets for the first time after her refit. During this time the ship evidenced the results of a too-hastily completed refit with condenser problems and engine defects that sometimes left her unable to steam faster than 10 knots. Vice-Admiral Doveton Sturdee's battlecruisers arrived on the 26th and he took Stoddart's ships under his command and then proceeded to the Falkland Islands two days later.

=== Battle of the Falklands ===
Upon arrival at Port Stanley on 7 December, Sturdee ordered Kent to anchor in the outer harbour and be prepared to relieve the armed merchant cruiser Macedonia as the harbour guardship the following morning. He planned to recoal the entire squadron the following day from the two available colliers and to begin the search for the East Asia Squadron the day after. Vice-Admiral Maximilian von Spee, commander of the German squadron, had other plans and intended to destroy the radio station at Port Stanley on the morning of 8 December. The appearance of two German ships at 07:30 caught Sturdee's ships by surprise although they were driven off by 12-inch (305 mm) shells fired by the predreadnought battleship Canopus when they came within range around 09:20. Kent, though, had been ordered out of the harbour at 08:10 to protect Macedonia and keep the Germans under observation. This gave time for the squadron to raise steam, although the cruisers had not yet begun to recoal. The squadron cleared the harbour by 10:30 and Sturdee ordered, "general chase". His two battlecruisers were the fastest ships present and inexorably began to close on the German cruisers. They opened fire at 12:55 and began to straddle the light cruiser Leipzig, the rear ship in the German formation. It was clear to Spee that his ships could not outrun the battlecruisers and that the only hope for any of his ships to survive was to scatter. So he turned his two armoured cruisers around to buy time by engaging the battlecruisers and ordered his three light cruisers to disperse at 13:20.

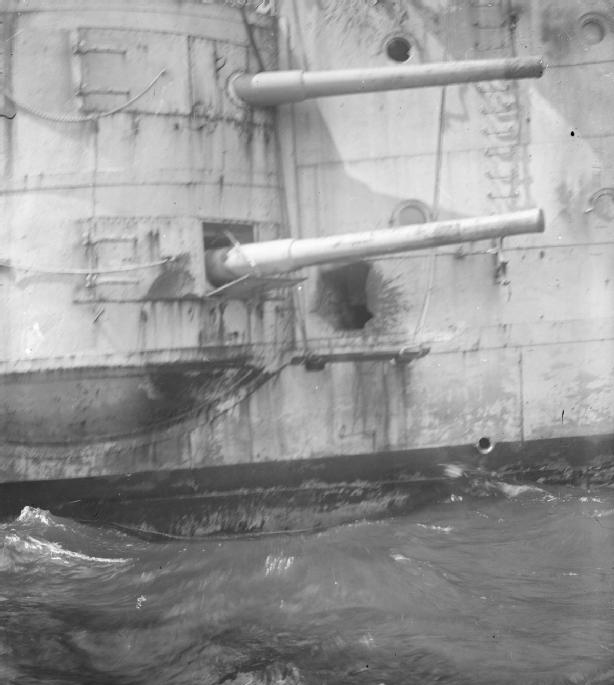
Starboard forward casemate showing some of the damage incurred by Kent during the Battle of the Falkland Islands

In accordance with Sturdee's plans, Kent, her sister ship, Cornwall, and the light cruiser Glasgow immediately set off in pursuit while the battlecruisers and the slow armoured cruiser Carnarvon dealt with the German armoured cruisers. At 14:45 Glasgow, the fastest of the British cruisers, was close enough to Leipzig to open fire and the two ships exchanged salvos, scoring the occasional hit. An hour later, the Germans scattered in different directions; Cornwall and Glasgow pursued Leipzig while Kent went after Nürnberg. Short on coal, her crew threw in everything burnable, and she reached 24 knots (44 km/h; 28 mph) in her pursuit; she closed to within 11,000 yards (10,000 m) when the German cruiser opened fire at 17:00. Kent replied nine minutes later with her forward guns; neither ship hit anything at that time. At 17:35 two of Nürnberg's worn-out boilers burst, which reduced her speed to 19 knots (35 km/h; 22 mph). As Kent continued to close, the German ship turned about for a fight when the range was down to 4,000 yards (3,700 m).

Most of the German 105-millimetre (4.1 in) shells failed to damage the British ship, but one did burst inside a gun position, killing or wounding most of its crew, and another burst inside the wireless compartment and knocked out her radio transmitter. The British shells battered Nürnberg severely; she was dead in the water by 18:25 with only two guns able to fire. Ten minutes later not a gun could shoot and the cruiser was aflame. She did not strike her colours until 18:57 and then lowered a boat filled with some of her wounded men. It promptly sank and Kent had to repair the splinter holes in her own boats before they could be launched. Nürnberg capsized half an hour later and Kent continued to search until 21:00, but only rescued a dozen men, five of whom later died. She had been hit 38 times, but none of them penetrated her armour. One shell passed through the radio office without detonating and disabled Kent's transmitter. Another shell burst outside a midships casemate and ignited several bags of cordite. The flash fire travelled down the ammunition hoist, but quick action by a Royal Marine in the ammunition party in removing the cordite charge ready to be hoisted, closing the door to the magazine and promptly using a fire hose prevented a catastrophe. The ship suffered six crewmen were killed and eight seriously wounded during the battle; ten of these were in the casemate where the cordite ignited. Kent was critically short of coal and had to steam slowly enough that she did not arrive at Port Stanley until the following afternoon.

=== Battle of Más a Tierra ===
Sturdee's ships continued to search for Dresden even after he returned to England. The German cruiser successfully evaded the searching British for months by hiding in the maze of bays and channels surrounding Tierra del Fuego. She began moving up the Chilean coast in February 1915 until she was unexpectedly spotted by Kent at a range of 11,000 yards on 8 March when a fog burned off. The British cruiser tried to close the distance, but Dresden managed to break contact after a five-hour chase. Kent, however, intercepted a message during the pursuit from Dresden to one of her colliers to meet her at Robinson Crusoe Island in the Juan Fernández Islands. Dresden arrived there the next day, virtually out of coal.

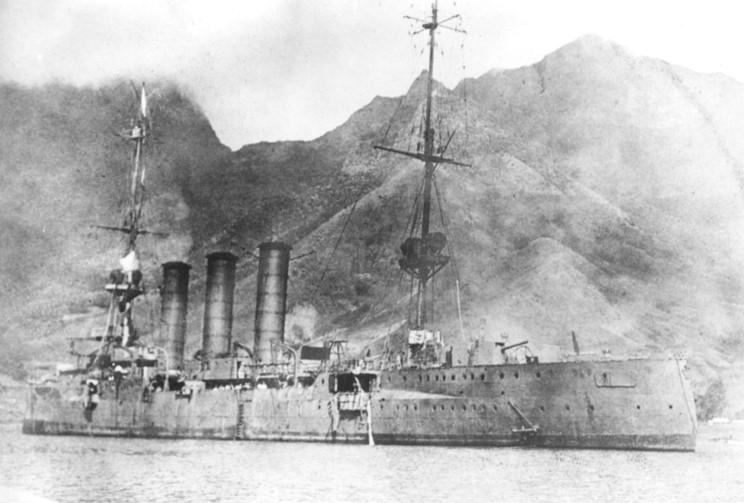
Dresden, 14 March 1915, the white flag of surrender is flying from the foremast

International law allowed the German ship a stay of 24 hours before she would have to leave or be interned and her captain claimed that his engines were disabled which extended the deadline to eight days. In the meantime, Kent had summoned Glasgow and the two ships entered Cumberland Bay in the island on the morning of 14 March and found Dresden at anchor. The German ship trained her guns on the British ships and Glasgow opened fire, Captain John Luce justifying his action by deeming it an unfriendly act by an interned ship that had frequently violated Chilean neutrality. Dresden hoisted a white flag four minutes later as she was already on fire and holed at her waterline. A boat brought Lieutenant Wilhelm Canaris to Glasgow to complain that his ship was under Chilean protection. Luce told him that the question of neutrality could be settled by diplomats and that he would destroy the German ship unless she surrendered. By the time that Canaris returned to Dresden, her crew had finished preparations for scuttling and abandoned ship after opening her Kingston valves. It took 20 minutes before the cruiser capsized to port and sank. The British shells had killed one midshipman and eight sailors and wounded three officers and twelve ratings.

=== Subsequent activities ===
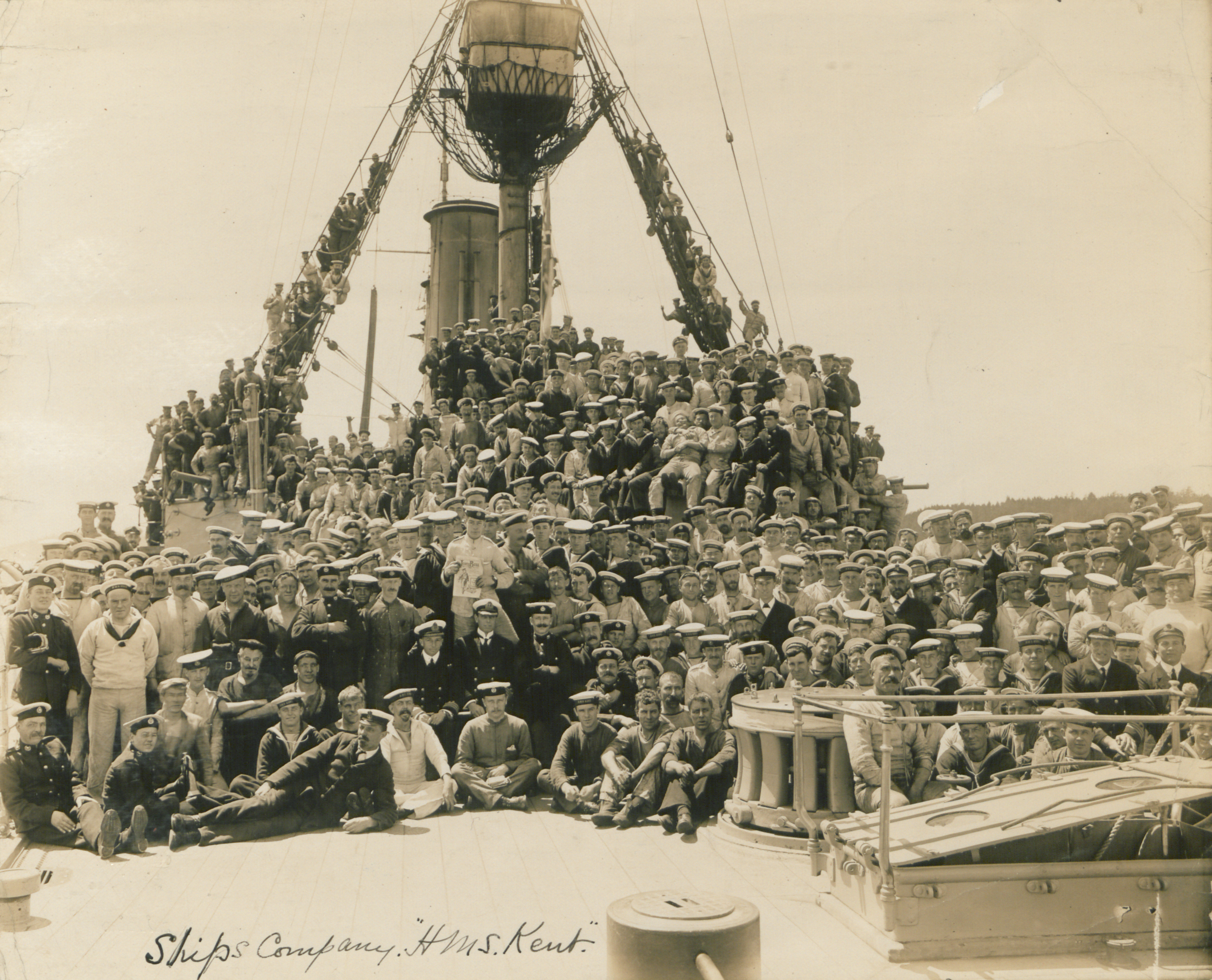
Ship's Company, HMS Kent, 1915

Kent patrolled the Chilean coast for the next several months, searching for German colliers. The ship was refitted at Esquimalt Royal Navy Dockyard in British Columbia from 25 May to 9 July. She resumed patrolling the Pacific coast of South America until she arrived at the Falklands on 7 March 1916 and departed on 6 April to unsuccessfully search for Ernest Shackleton's Antarctic expedition on South Georgia Island and then Simon's Town, South Africa, where they arrived on the 23rd. Refitting until 29 May, Kent was running trials and working up until 15 June. She then began escorting convoys between South Africa and West African ports, or the Cape Verde Islands. She escorted a convoy to England where she arrived at Devonport on 7 January 1917 and then resumed her convoy escort duties along the African coast. The ship arrived in England on 4 June 1918 to begin a refit at HM Dockyard, Devonport, but as Kent was preparing to leave the convoy a little after midnight, she apparently steered for Kenilworth Castle, causing that ship to turn to avoid being rammed and cutting off the stern of the destroyer Rival. That caused a depth charge to detonate underneath Kenilworth Castle, blowing a hole in that ship's hull although she successfully made it to port.

Kent was refitting until 14 July when she departed for Siberia to relieve her sister Suffolk. After arriving at Simon's Town, the ship sailed for Singapore on 24 August. She arrived there on 20 September and then continued onwards to Hong Kong which she reached on 10 October. Kent remained there with engine problems until 21 December when she departed for Vladivostok via Shanghai, China, and Nagasaki, Japan. The ship arrived there on 4 January 1919 to support American and Japanese forces in action against the Bolsheviks. About half of her Royal Marines and a few crewmen volunteered to man a six-inch gun and some 12-pounder guns left behind by Suffolk in Omsk on 6 April. They converted a tugboat in Perm to mount the 12-pounders and modified a large barge for the six-inch gun. On 23 May they engaged a Bolshevik river flotilla near Elabuga and drove three of the Communists' ships ashore and set one afire. Their victory did little to effect the strategic situation as the Bolsheviks drove the Whites back to Perm. Kent's troops were able to transfer the guns to railroad cars before the city was captured on 30 June and they were sold to the Whites once the men reached Omsk. They arrived back at Vladivostok on 18 August to find out that Kent had ordered to Hong Kong in their absence.

On 13 May, Kent accompanied the Russian steamship SS Georgie carrying troops to seize Tetyukhe; the ships later loaded refugees and arrived back at Vladivostok three days later. Kent departed Vladivostok on 23 June bound for Hong Kong via Weihaiwei, China. She arrived at her destination on 2 July and was paid off on 7 August. The ship was listed for sale there in March 1920 and sold for scrap on 20 June.

In 1964 a Falklands Islands commemorative stamp incorrectly pictured HMS Glasgow instead of Kent.

== Bibliography ==
- Corbett, Julian (1997) [1938]. Naval Operations to the Battle of the Falklands. History of the Great War: Based on Official Documents. Vol. I (2nd ed.). London and Nashville, Tennessee: Imperial War Museum and Battery Press. ISBN 0-89839-256-X.
- Friedman, Norman (2012). British Cruisers of the Victorian Era. Barnsley, UK: Seaforth. ISBN 978-1-59114-068-9.
- Friedman, Norman (2011). Naval Weapons of World War One: Guns, Torpedoes, Mines and ASW Weapons of All Nations; An Illustrated Directory. Barnsley, UK: Seaforth Publishing. ISBN 978-1-84832-100-7.
- Head, Michael (2019). "Siberia". Warship International. LVI (1): 55–74. ISSN 0043-0374.
- Howland, Vernon (1998). "HMS Kent (1914–1915): Portsmouth to the Falkland Islands – Early Days". Warship International. XXXV (1): 18–40. ISSN 0043-0374.
- Massie, Robert K. (2003). Castles of Steel: Britain, Germany, and the Winning of the Great War at Sea. New York: Random House. ISBN 0-679-45671-6.
- McBride, Keith (1988). "The First County Class Cruisers of the Royal Navy, Part I: The Monmouths". Warship. 46 (April). London: Conway Maritime Press: 19–26. ISSN 0142-6222.
- Preston, Antony (1985). "Great Britain and Empire Forces". In Gray, Randal (ed.). Conway's All the World's Fighting Ships 1906–1921. Annapolis, Maryland: Naval Institute Press. pp. 1–104. ISBN 0-85177-245-5.
- Roberts, John (1979). "Great Britain and Empire Forces". In Chesneau, Roger & Kolesnik, Eugene M. (eds.). Conway's All the World's Fighting Ships 1860-1905. Greenwich, UK: Conway Maritime Press. pp. 1–113. ISBN 0-8317-0302-4.
- Silverstone, Paul H. (1984). Directory of the World's Capital Ships. New York: Hippocrene Books. ISBN 0-88254-979-0.
- "Transcript: HMS Kent – October 1914 to December 1917, British Waters, Battle of the Falklands, Pacific Coast of South America, Central & South Atlantic (Part 1 of 2)". Royal Navy Log Books of the World War 1 Era. Naval-History.net.
