= HMS Cornwall (1902) =

Royal Navy armoured cruiser

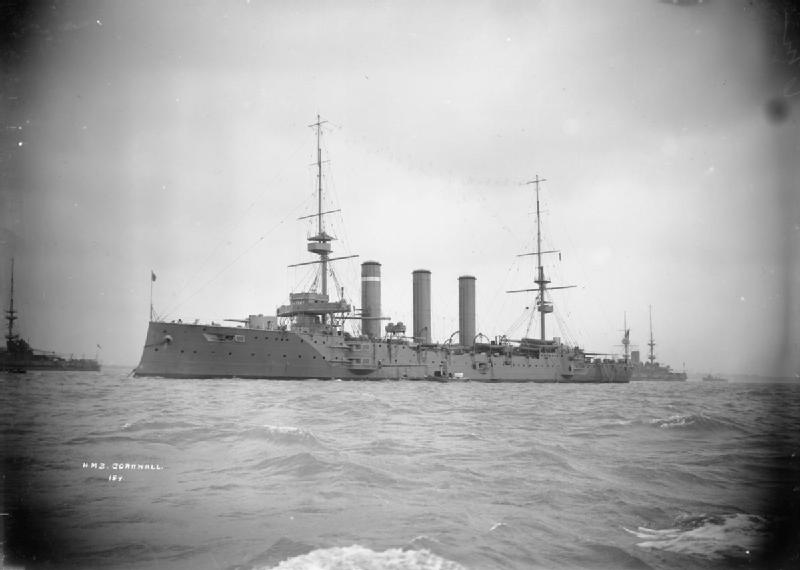
- Cornwall at anchor

History

United Kingdom
- Name: Cornwall
- Namesake: Cornwall
- Builder: HM Dockyard, Pembroke
- Laid down: 11 March 1901
- Launched: 29 October 1902
- Christened: by Emily Harriet, Countess of St Germans
- Completed: 1 December 1904
- Fate: Sold for scrap, 7 July 1920

General characteristics
- Class & type: Monmouth-class armoured cruiser
- Displacement: 9,800 long tons (10,000 t) (normal)
- Length: 463 ft 6 in (141.3 m) (o/a)
- Beam: 66 ft (20.1 m)
- Draught: 25 ft (7.6 m)
- Installed power: 31 water-tube boilers; 22,000 ihp (16,000 kW)
- Propulsion: 2 × shafts; 2 × triple-expansion steam engines
- Speed: 23 knots (43 km/h; 26 mph)
- Complement: 678
- Armament: 2 × twin, 10 × single 6 in (152 mm) guns; 10 × single 12-pdr (3 in (76 mm)) guns; 3 × single 3-pdr (1.9 in (47 mm)) guns; 2 × 18 in (450 mm) torpedo tubes
- Armour: Belt: 2–4 in (51–102 mm); Decks: 0.75–2 in (19–51 mm); Barbettes: 4 in (102 mm); Turrets: 4 in (102 mm); Conning tower: 10 in (254 mm)

HMS Cornwall was one of 10 Monmouth-class armoured cruisers built for the Royal Navy in the first decade of the 20th century. She was assigned to the 2nd Cruiser Squadron of the Channel Fleet on completion in 1903. The ship was refitted in 1907 in preparation for service as a training ship for cadets with the 4th Cruiser Squadron on the North America and West Indies Station beginning in 1908. In 1909 she toured the Mediterranean and the Baltic, where she entertained the Kaiser who visited on his yacht the Hohenzollern at Kiel on 24 June. Cornwall ran aground in 1911 while trying to free another cruiser, but was successfully refloated and repaired.

She captured a German merchant ship days after the beginning of World War I in August 1914 and was then sent to the Central Atlantic to search for German commerce raiders. Later that year, the ship was assigned to the squadron that destroyed the German East Asia Squadron at the Battle of the Falklands, where she helped to sink a German light cruiser. Cornwall briefly blockaded a German cruiser in East Africa in early 1915 before she was sent to participate in the Dardanelles campaign a month later. The ship was then transferred to the China Station late in the year and remained there until the end of 1916. She was then transferred to the North America Station that year for convoy escort duties and remained on that duty for the rest of the war. Cornwall became a training ship in 1919 before she was paid off later that year. The ship was sold for scrap in 1920.

== Design and description ==
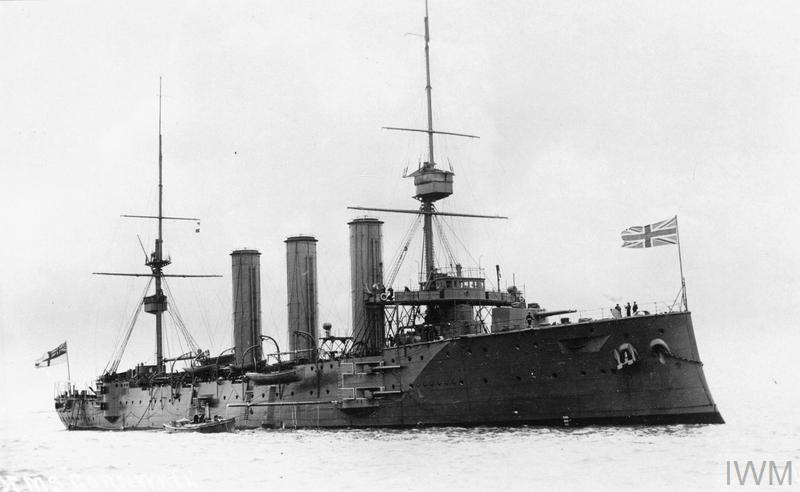
Cornwall during WWI

The Monmouths were intended to protect British merchant shipping from fast cruisers like the French Guichen, Châteaurenault or the Dupleix class. The ships were designed to displace 9,800 long tons (10,000 t). They had an overall length of 463 feet 6 inches (141.3 m), a beam of 66 feet (20.1 m) and a deep draught of 25 feet (7.6 m). They were powered by two 4-cylinder triple-expansion steam engines, each driving one shaft using steam provided by 31 Belleville boilers. The engines produced a total of 22,000 indicated horsepower (16,000 kW) which was designed to give the ships a maximum speed of 23 knots (43 km/h; 26 mph). She carried a maximum of 1,600 long tons (1,600 t) of coal and her complement consisted of 678 officers and ratings.

The Monmouth-class ships' main armament consisted of fourteen breech-loading (BL) 6-inch (152 mm) Mk VII guns. Four of these guns were mounted in two twin-gun turrets, one each fore and aft of the superstructure, and the others were positioned in casemates amidships. Six of these were mounted on the main deck and were only usable in calm weather. Ten quick-firing (QF) 12-pounder (3-inch (76 mm)) 12-cwt guns (Note: "Cwt" is the abbreviation for hundredweight, 12 cwt referring to the weight of the gun.) were fitted for defence against torpedo boats. Cornwall also carried three 3-pounder 1.9 in (47 mm) Hotchkiss guns and two submerged 18-inch (450 mm) torpedo tubes.

Beginning in 1915, the main deck six-inch guns of the Monmouth-class ships were moved to the upper deck and given gun shields. Their casemates were plated over to improve seakeeping. The twelve-pounder guns displaced by the transfer were repositioned elsewhere. At some point in the war, a pair of three-pounder anti-aircraft guns were installed on the upper deck.

The ship's waterline armour belt was four inches (102 mm) thick amidships and two-inch (51 mm) forward. The armour of the gun turrets, their barbettes and the casemates was four inches thick. The protective deck armour ranged in thickness from 0.75–2 inches (19–51 mm) and the conning tower was protected by ten inches (254 mm) of armour.

== Construction and service ==
Cornwall, named to commemorate the English county, was laid down at Pembroke Royal Dockyard, Wales, on 11 March 1901, and launched on 29 October 1902, when she was christened by the Countess of St Germans (nominated for this by the local Lord-Lieutenant). She was completed on 1 December 1904 and was initially assigned to the 2nd Cruiser Squadron of the Channel Fleet. In December 1906 the ship began a refit that lasted through 1907. She became a cadet training ship in January 1908 and was assigned to the 4th Cruiser Squadron on the North America and West Indies Station. Under the command of Captain Reginald Hall, in the summer of 1909, the ship undertook a naval cruising tour of the Baltic Sea. The ship visited Norway, Denmark, Sweden and Germany as well as some ports in the Eastern Baltic. The cruise involved entertaining and welcoming on board royalty and other officials, including Kaiser Wilhelm II, Queen Maud of Wales and Princess Margaret of Connaught. During the cruise, Royal Navy officers Lieutenant Vivian Brandon and Lieutenant Bernard Frederick Trench also undertook covert reporting ashore of fortifications and beaches in the Baltic, in case of potential future conflict, their information and services later becoming formalised under the Naval Intelligence Division in 1912.

On 6 August 1911 Cornwall ran aground on Pinnacle Rock, off Cape Sable Island in Nova Scotia while assisting the protected cruiser HMCS Niobe, which had also run aground. Both cruisers were refloated and Cornwall was repaired at His Majesty's Canadian Dockyard, Halifax.

In December 1913, the ship was refitting in Devonport and resumed her training duties after it was completed in January 1914. Over the next six months, she visited ports ranging from Malta to São Vicente, Cape Verde to Trondheim, Norway. Cornwall participated in the July 1914 Fleet review at Spithead and was give a short refit at the end of the month. Upon its completion, she was assigned to the 5th Cruiser Squadron which was tasked with trade protection between the Azores, the Canary Islands and Gibraltar. En route to the latter, Cornwall captured the German collier SS Syra on 5 August and was transferred to patrol the Brazilian coast in September as part of the 4th Cruiser Squadron under Vice-Admiral Christopher Cradock.

After the German raider Cap Trafalgar was sunk, RMS Carmania was badly damaged, having lost nine men, but was able to rendezvous with Cornwall. Carmania was barely afloat when it made contact with Cornwall on 15 October. Carmania was escorted to Permambuco in Brazil where the ship was repaired before being sent to Gibraltar for further repair.

The ship was later assigned to a new squadron intended to patrol the River Plate area and did not join Cradock's ships as they searched for the German East Asia Squadron off the Chilean coast. After Cradock's squadron was destroyed in the Battle of Coronel on 1 November, Cornwall then proceeded to the Falkland Islands with the squadron commanded by Vice-Admiral Doveton Sturdee.

=== Battle of the Falklands ===
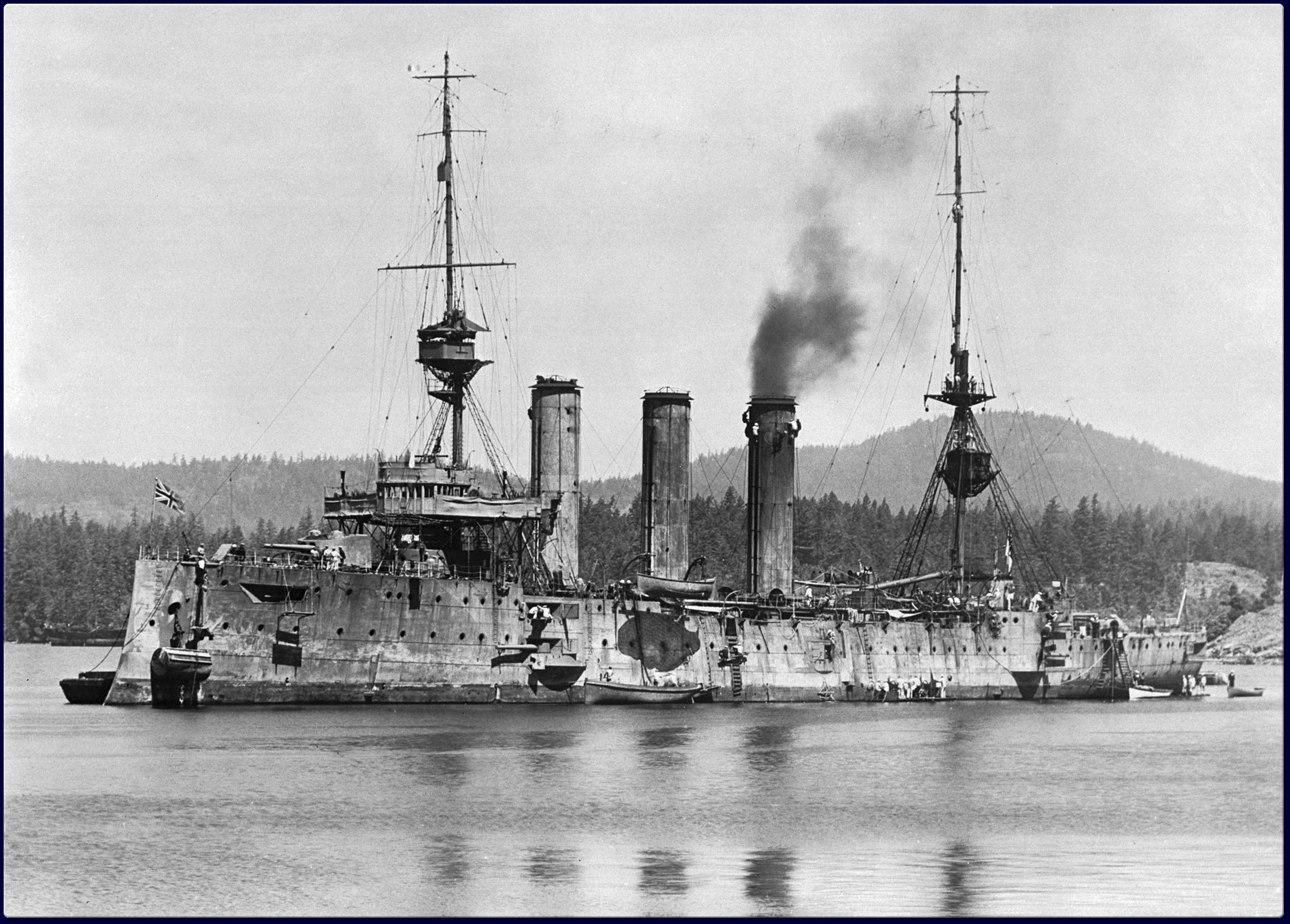
Cornwall, in Esquimalt Harbour repairing damage received during the Battle of the Falkland Islands

Upon arrival at Port Stanley on 7 December 1914, Sturdee gave permission for Cornwall to put out her fires to clean her boilers and repair one engine. He planned to recoal the entire squadron the following day from the two available colliers and to begin the search for the East Asia Squadron the day after. Vice-Admiral Maximilian von Spee, commander of the German squadron, had other plans and intended to destroy the radio station at Port Stanley on the morning of 8 December. The appearance of two German ships at 07:30 caught Sturdee's ships by surprise although they were driven off by 12-inch (305 mm) shells fired by the predreadnought battleship Canopus when they came within range around 09:20. This gave time for Cornwall to reassemble her engine and raise steam, although she had not even started to recoal. The squadron cleared the harbour by 10:30 and Sturdee ordered, "general chase". His two battlecruisers were the fastest ships present and inexorably began to close on the German cruisers. They opened fire at 12:55 and began to straddle the light cruiser Leipzig, the rear ship in the German formation. It was clear to Spee that his ships could not outrun the battlecruisers and that the only hope for any of his ships to survive was to scatter. So he turned his two armoured cruisers around to buy time by engaging the battlecruisers and ordered his three light cruisers to disperse at 13:20.

In accordance with Sturdee's plans, Cornwall, her sister ship, Kent, and the light cruiser Glasgow immediately set off in pursuit while the battlecruisers and the slow armoured cruiser Carnarvon dealt with the German armoured cruisers. At 14:45 Glasgow, the fastest of the British cruisers, was close enough to Leipzig to open fire and the two ships exchanged salvos and scoring the occasional hit. An hour later, the Germans scattered in different directions; Cornwall and Glasgow pursued Leipzig while Kent went after Nürnberg. Cornwall closed on the German ship at full speed, trusting to her armour to keep out the 105-millimetre (4.1 in) shells, while the unarmoured Glasgow manoeuvered at a distance. The range from Cornwall was 7,000 yards (6,400 m) at 18:00 and her shells set Leipzig on fire. Five minutes later, the German ship had ceased firing and the British ships closed to 5,000 yards (4,600 m) to see if she would surrender. One last gun fired and Leipzig did not strike her colours so the British fired several additional salvos at 19:25. The German captain had mustered his surviving crewmen on deck preparatory to abandoning ship, but the ship's flag could not be reached because it was surrounded by flames, and the British shells wrought havoc on the assembled crew. Leipzig fired two green flares at 20:12 and the British ships closed to within 500 yards (460 m) and lowered boats to rescue the Germans at 20:45. Their ship capsized at 21:32 but only a total of 18 men were rescued in the darkness. Leipzig had hit Cornwall 18 times, but she did not lose a single man. The British ship rescued one officer and three ratings from Leipzig. Cornwall spent much of the rest of the month searching for the German ships that had not yet been captured or destroyed before departing for home on 3 January 1915.

=== Subsequent service ===
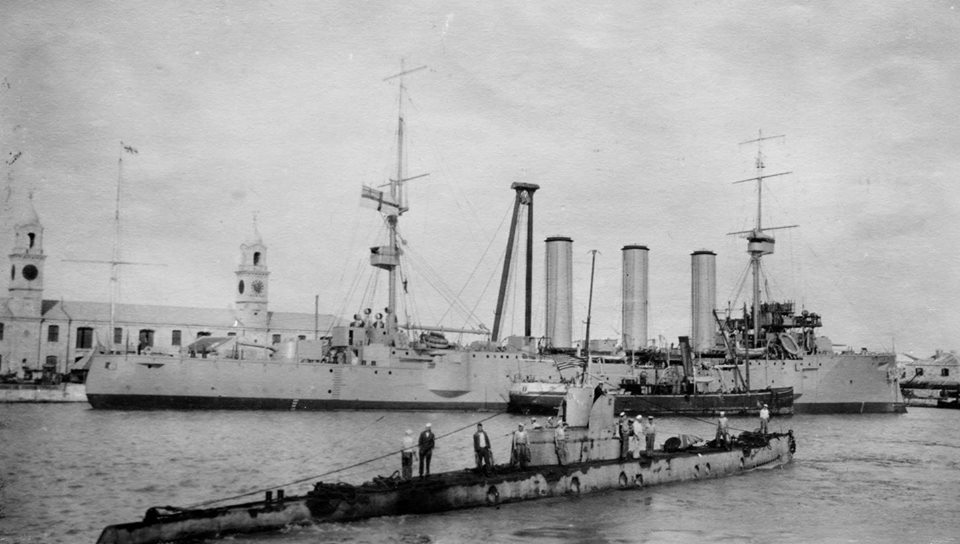
HMS Cornwall at the Royal Naval Dockyard in Bermuda circa 1918

She arrived at Devonport on 11 February 1915 and spent the next month and a half refitting there and in Avonmouth before departing for South Africa on 23 March. The ship arrived at Kibondo Island off the German East African coast on 27 April to blockade the light cruiser Königsberg in the Rufiji River. Several weeks later Cornwall was called north to reinforce the British forces involved in the Dardanelles Campaign on 10 May. By the end of the year, she was en route to the China Station. The ship arrived at Singapore on 17 February 1916 and began a lengthy refit that lasted until 6 May. She then patrolled the area of the Dutch East Indies until returning to Singapore for the next several months. Cornwall departed for French Indochina on 21 July and the Governor-General of French Indochina visited the ship on 26 July while she was docked at Saigon. After her return to Singapore, she was inspected by the Commander-in-Chief of the China Station, Vice-Admiral William Grant, on 21 August. Cornwall resumed patrolling in the East Indies shortly afterwards and continued until Grant hoisted his flag aboard the ship on 22 October as he and his staff was ferried to Hong Kong. Upon arrival five days later, Grant lowered his flag as he transferred ashore. The ship patrolled off the Chinese coast for most of November and returned to Singapore on 11 December. Cornwall departed the city on 20 December bound for South Africa. On 16 January 1917, the ship was escorting a convoy of six troopships when she narrowly missed encountering the German commerce raider SMS Wolf off Saldanha Bay.

A few days after arriving in Freetown, Sierra Leone, on 29 January, Cornwall dismounted four of her 12-pounder guns; two of the guns were transferred to troopships in her convoy. She led the convoy back to sea on 2 February, bound for Devonport where they arrived on 17 February. The ship then sailed to Liverpool to begin a lengthy refit and was paid off there on 7 March. She recommissioned on 4 August and spent the next two weeks preparing to go back to sea. Cornwall departed Liverpool on 17 August and escorted at least one troopship to Halifax, Nova Scotia, arriving there a week later. She was now assigned to the North Atlantic and West Indies Station and began escorting convoys between North America and Britain on 19 September. Cornwall continued in this role for the next year and escorted her last convoy when she arrived in Bermuda on 18 October 1918. She departed the island on 14 December and arrived at Devonport eight days later. The ship resumed her prewar role as a cadet training ship on 25 January 1919. Vice-Admiral Morgan Singer, Commander-in-Chief, America and West Indies, inspected the ship on 9 May while she was berthed in Bermuda. Cornwall returned to Devonport on 31 July and was paid off on 21 August. The ship was sold for scrap on 7 June 1920. In 1922, Mount Cornwall in the Canadian Rockies was named in tribute to the ship.

== Bibliography ==
- Corbett, Julian (1997) [1938]. Naval Operations to the Battle of the Falklands. History of the Great War: Based on Official Documents. Vol. I (2nd ed.). London and Nashville, Tennessee: Imperial War Museum and Battery Press. ISBN 0-89839-256-X.
- Corbett, Julian (1997) [1929 second]. Naval Operations. History of the Great War: Based on Official Documents. Vol. II. London and Nashville, Tennessee: Imperial War Museum in association with the Battery Press. ISBN 1-870423-74-7.
- Corbett, Julian (1997) [1940]. Naval Operations. History of the Great War: Based on Official Documents. Vol. III (Second ed.). London and Nashville, Tennessee: Imperial War Museum in association with the Battery Press. ISBN 1-870423-50-X.
- Dodson, Aidan (2026). "The Cadet Training Ships of the Royal Navy". In Jordan, John (ed.). Warship 2026. Osprey Publishing. pp. 156–174. ISBN 978-1-4728-7259-3.
- Friedman, Norman (2012). British Cruisers of the Victorian Era. Barnsley, UK: Seaforth. ISBN 978-1-59114-068-9.
- Friedman, Norman (2011). Naval Weapons of World War One: Guns, Torpedoes, Mines and ASW Weapons of All Nations; An Illustrated Directory. Barnsley, UK: Seaforth Publishing. ISBN 978-1-84832-100-7.
- Massie, Robert K. (2003). Castles of Steel: Britain, Germany, and the Winning of the Great War at Sea. New York: Random House. ISBN 0-679-45671-6.
- McBride, Keith (1988). "The First County Class Cruisers of the Royal Navy, Part I: The Monmouths". Warship. 46 (April). London: Conway Maritime Press: 19–26. ISSN 0142-6222.
- Newbolt, Henry (1996) [1928]. Naval Operations. History of the Great War Based on Official Documents. Vol. IV. Nashville, Tennessee: Battery Press. ISBN 0-89839-253-5.
- Newbolt, Henry (1996) [1931]. Naval Operations. History of the Great War Based on Official Documents. Vol. V. Nashville, Tennessee: Battery Press. ISBN 0-89839-255-1.
- Preston, Antony (1985). "Great Britain and Empire Forces". In Gray, Randal (ed.). Conway's All the World's Fighting Ships 1906–1921. Annapolis, Maryland: Naval Institute Press. pp. 1–104. ISBN 0-85177-245-5.
- Roberts, John (1979). "Great Britain and Empire Forces". In Chesneau, Roger & Kolesnik, Eugene M. (eds.). Conway's All the World's Fighting Ships 1860-1905. Greenwich, UK: Conway Maritime Press. pp. 1–113. ISBN 0-8317-0302-4.
- Silverstone, Paul H. (1984). Directory of the World's Capital Ships. New York: Hippocrene Books. ISBN 0-88254-979-0.
- "Transcript: HMS Cornwall – December 1913 to August 1919, Central Atlantic, Mediterranean, South Atlantic, Battle of the Falklands, East Indies Station, China Station, North Atlantic Convoys, North America & West Indies Station". Royal Navy Log Books of the World War 1 Era. Naval-History.net.
