= HMS Suffolk (1903) =

Cruiser of the Royal Navy

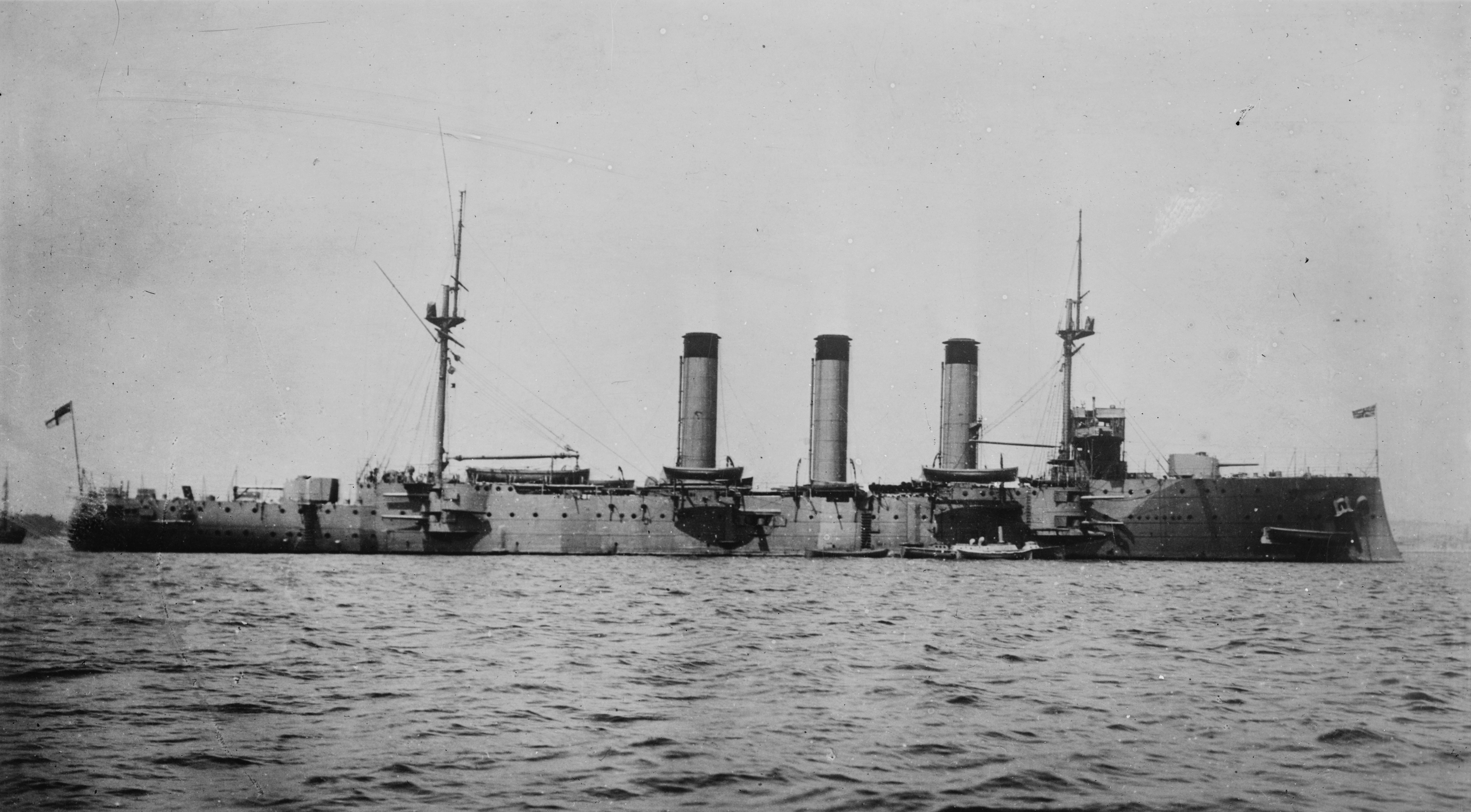
- Suffolk at anchor

History

United Kingdom
- Name: Suffolk
- Namesake: Suffolk
- Builder: Portsmouth Royal Dockyard
- Laid down: 25 March 1901
- Launched: 15 January 1903
- Completed: 21 May 1904
- Fate: Sold for scrap, 1 July 1920

General characteristics
- Class & type: Monmouth-class armoured cruiser
- Displacement: 9,800 long tons (10,000 t) (normal)
- Length: 463 ft 6 in (141.3 m) (o/a)
- Beam: 66 ft (20.1 m)
- Draught: 25 ft (7.6 m)
- Installed power: 31 water-tube boilers; 22,000 ihp (16,000 kW)
- Propulsion: 2 × shafts; 2 × triple-expansion steam engines
- Speed: 23 knots (43 km/h; 26 mph)
- Complement: 678
- Armament: 2 × twin, 10 × single 6 in (152 mm) guns; 10 × single 12-pdr (3 in (76 mm)) guns; 3 × single 3-pdr (1.9 in (47 mm)) guns; 2 × 18 in (450 mm) torpedo tubes
- Armour: Belt: 2–4 in (51–102 mm); Decks: 0.75–2 in (19–51 mm); Barbettes: 4 in (102 mm); Turrets: 4 in (102 mm); Conning tower: 10 in (254 mm)

HMS Suffolk was one of 10 Monmouth-class armoured cruisers built for the Royal Navy in the first decade of the 20th century. Upon completion she was assigned to the 3rd Cruiser Squadron of the Mediterranean Fleet and was then assigned to the 5th Cruiser Squadron in the Mediterranean in 1909 after a lengthy refit. She returned home for another refit in 1912 and became the flagship of the 4th Cruiser Squadron on the North America and West Indies Station in 1913.

After the beginning of World War I in August 1914, Suffolk became a private ship and searched for German commerce raiders while protecting British shipping. She captured a German merchantman shortly after the war began. She remained in the Atlantic until she became flagship of the China Station in 1917 In late 1918 the ship was deployed to Vladivostok to support the Siberian Intervention during the Russian Civil War. She returned home in 1919 and briefly became a training ship before she was sold for scrap in 1920.

== Design and description ==
The Monmouths were intended to protect British merchant shipping from fast cruisers like the French Guichen, Châteaurenault or the Dupleix class. The ships were designed to displace 9,800 long tons (10,000 t). They had an overall length of 463 feet 6 inches (141.3 m), a beam of 66 feet (20.1 m) and a deep draught of 25 feet (7.6 m). They were powered by two 4-cylinder triple-expansion steam engines, each driving one shaft using steam provided by 31 Belleville boilers. The engines produced a total of 22,000 indicated horsepower (16,000 kW) which was designed to give the ships a maximum speed of 23 knots (43 km/h; 26 mph). Suffolk, however, reached 24.7 knots (45.7 km/h; 28.4 mph) during her sea trials. She carried a maximum of 1,600 long tons (1,600 t) of coal and her complement consisted of 678 officers and ratings.

The Monmouth-class ships' main armament consisted of fourteen breech-loading (BL) 6-inch (152 mm) Mk VII guns. Four of these guns were mounted in two twin-gun turrets, one each fore and aft of the superstructure, and the others were positioned in casemates amidships. Six of these were mounted on the main deck and were only usable in calm weather. Ten quick-firing (QF) 12-pounder (3-inch (76 mm)) 12-cwt guns (Note: "Cwt" is the abbreviation for hundredweight, 12 cwt referring to the weight of the gun.) were fitted for defence against torpedo boats. Suffolk also carried three 3-pounder 1.9 in (47 mm) Hotchkiss guns and two submerged 18-inch (450 mm) torpedo tubes.

Beginning in 1915, the main deck six-inch guns of the Monmouth-class ships were moved to the upper deck and given gun shields. Their casemates were plated over to improve seakeeping. The twelve-pounder guns displaced by the transfer were repositioned elsewhere. At some point in the war, a pair of three-pounder anti-aircraft guns were installed on the upper deck.

The ship's waterline armour belt was four inches (102 mm) thick amidships and two-inch (51 mm) forward. The armour of the gun turrets, their barbettes and the casemates was four inches thick. The protective deck armour ranged in thickness from 0.75–2 inches (19–51 mm) and the conning tower was protected by ten inches (254 mm) of armour.

== Construction and service ==
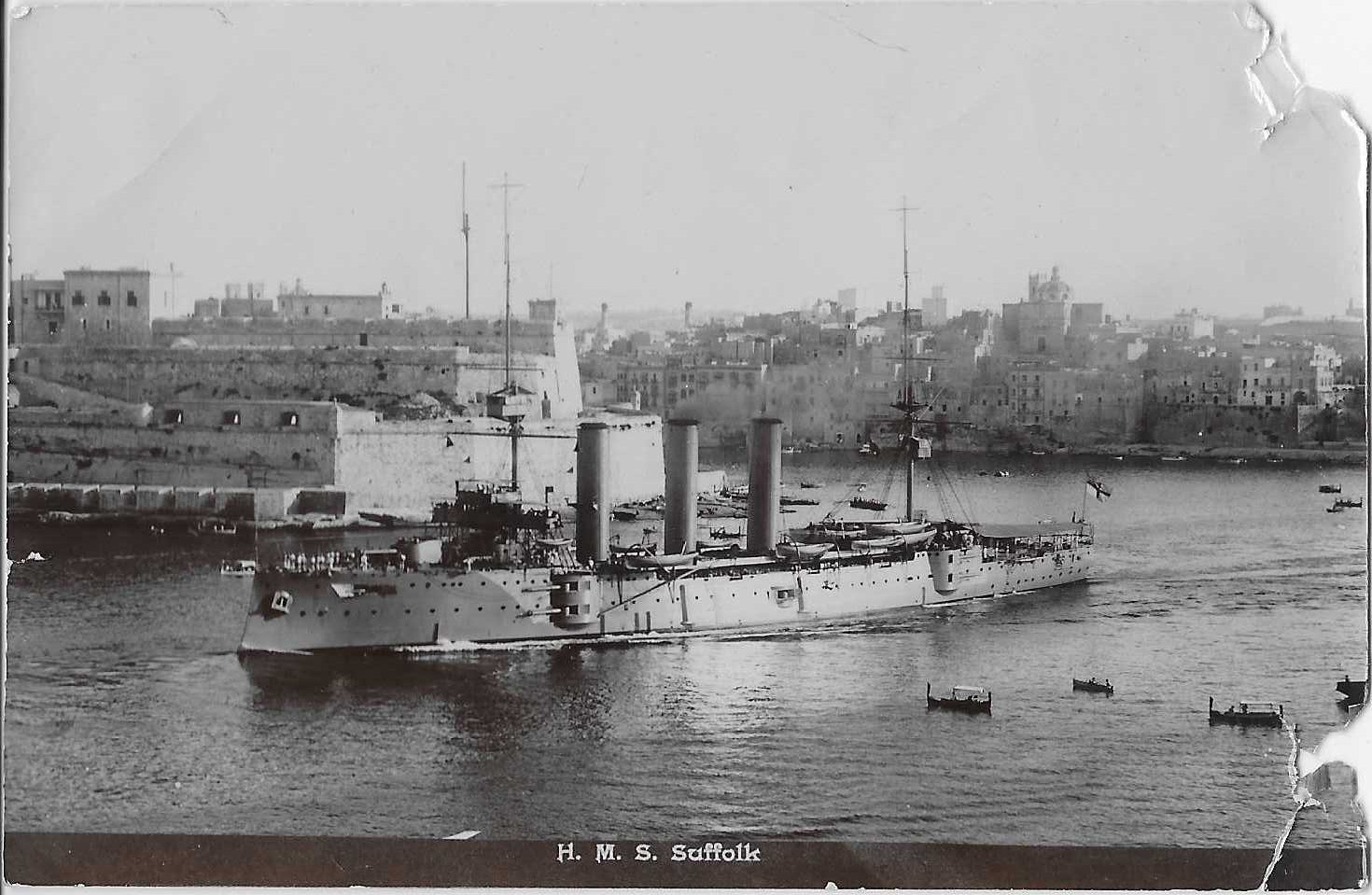
Suffolk underway in Malta

Suffolk, named to commemorate the English county, was laid down at Portsmouth Royal Dockyard on 25 March 1901 and launched on 15 January 1903, when she was named by Lady Stradbroke, wife of George Rous, 3rd Earl of Stradbroke, who was Vice-Admiral of Suffolk (an honorary appointment in the county for which the vessel was named). She was completed on 21 May 1904 and was assigned to the 3rd Cruiser Squadron of the Mediterranean Fleet. In October 1904 Captain (later First Sea Lord) David Beatty assumed command until he returned home in late 1905. The ship returned home in 1907 for a lengthy refit. She returned to the Mediterranean in 1909 and was assigned to the 5th Cruiser Squadron. She began another refit at Devonport Royal Dockyard in October 1912. When it was completed in February 1913, she became the flagship of Rear Admiral Sir Christopher Craddock's 4th Cruiser Squadron on the North America and West Indies Station.

After the start of the war, Cradock transferred his flag to the faster and more heavily armed Good Hope while Suffolk remained in the Atlantic hunting for German raiders. She captured a German merchant ship on 8 August and remained in the Atlantic, as a private ship until August 1917 when she became flagship of the China Station. She again became a private ship in November 1918 and deployed to Vladivostok to support the Siberian Intervention against the Bolsheviks. Suffolk returned home in 1919 and became a cadet training ship before she was listed for sale in April 1920. The ship was sold for scrap on 1 July and broken up in 1922 in Germany.

== Bibliography ==
- Corbett, Julian (March 1997) [1938]. Naval Operations to the Battle of the Falklands. History of the Great War: Based on Official Documents. Vol. I (2nd ed.). London and Nashville, Tennessee: Imperial War Museum and Battery Press. ISBN 0-89839-256-X.
- Friedman, Norman (2012). British Cruisers of the Victorian Era. Barnsley, UK: Seaforth. ISBN 978-1-59114-068-9.
- Friedman, Norman (2011). Naval Weapons of World War One: Guns, Torpedoes, Mines and ASW Weapons of All Nations; An Illustrated Directory. Barnsley, UK: Seaforth Publishing. ISBN 978-1-84832-100-7.
- Head, Michael (2019). "Siberia". Warship International. LVI (1): 55–74. ISSN 0043-0374.
- Lambert, Andrew D. (2008). Admirals: The Naval Commanders Who Made Britain Great. London: Faber. ISBN 978-0-571-23156-0.
- Massie, Robert K. (2003). Castles of Steel: Britain, Germany, and the Winning of the Great War at Sea. New York: Random House. ISBN 0-679-45671-6.
- McBride, Keith (1988). "The First County Class Cruisers of the Royal Navy, Part I: The Monmouths". Warship. 46 (April). London: Conway Maritime Press: 19–26. ISSN 0142-6222.
- Preston, Antony (1985). "Great Britain and Empire Forces". In Gray, Randal (ed.). Conway's All the World's Fighting Ships 1906–1921. Annapolis, Maryland: Naval Institute Press. pp. 1–104. ISBN 0-85177-245-5.
- Roberts, John (1979). "Great Britain and Empire Forces". In Chesneau, Roger & Kolesnik, Eugene M. (eds.). Conway's All the World's Fighting Ships 1860-1905. Greenwich, UK: Conway Maritime Press. pp. 1–113. ISBN 0-8317-0302-4.
- Silverstone, Paul H. (1984). Directory of the World's Capital Ships. New York: Hippocrene Books. ISBN 0-88254-979-0.
- "Transcript: HMS Suffolk – February 1914 to August 1916; June 1917 to October 1919, West Indies (4th Cruiser Squadron), North America and West Indies Station; China Station (including Russian Intervention, Siberia)". Royal Navy Log Books of the World War 1 Era. Naval-History.net.
