= Dreadnought (book) =

1991 book by Robert K. Massie

Dreadnought: Britain, Germany, and the Coming of the Great War
- Author: Robert K. Massie
- Language: English
- Genre: Non-fiction
- Publisher: Random House
- Publication date: 1991
- Publication place: England
- Media type: Print (hardback)
- Pages: 1007
- ISBN: 0-394-52833-6
- OCLC: 23287851
- Dewey Decimal: 940.3/11 20
- LC Class: D517 .M37 1991
- Followed by: Castles of Steel: Britain, Germany, and the Winning of the Great War at Sea

Dreadnought: Britain, Germany, and the Coming of the Great War (1991) is a book by Robert K. Massie on the growing European tension in decades before World War I, especially the naval arms race between Britain and Germany. A sequel, covering the naval war between Germany and Britain, Castles of Steel: Britain, Germany, and the Winning of the Great War at Sea was published in 2004.

== Summary ==
Massie begins with the birth of Queen Victoria and describes the history of England and Germany up until the outbreak of World War I. Making extensive use of contemporaneous sources, such as letters and diaries, Massie sketches even players who are unlikely to be familiar to most readers, such as Georg Leo von Caprivi, German Chancellor from 1890 to 1894, who is described as having lived a spartan life, never marrying and not smoking. The major players, such as Kaiser William II are presented with full detail. For example, as an eight-year-old the future Kaiser, who had a withered left arm due to damage from forceps suffered at birth, was made to take riding lessons, and "[o]ver and over" per the supervising tutor, the "'weeping prince' was 'set on his horse, without stirrups and compelled to go through the paces. He fell off continually; every time, despite his prayers and tears, he was lifted up and set upon its back again.'" Other major players include William I, Alfred von Tirpitz, Lord Salisbury, Edward VII, Otto von Bismarck, Joseph Chamberlain, Arthur Balfour, H. H. Asquith and David Lloyd George, Sir Edward Grey and Winston Churchill.

The development of the British Navy is also covered in substantial detail, with Jackie Fisher presented fully. The insights that led to the conception and construction of the title Dreadnought are explained and the reader is informed that this was not the first HMS " Dreadnought" as there had been ships named "Dreadnought" all the way back to Elizabeth I. On the German side, the Tirpitz Plan is described, and the way that the Imperial German governmental structure permitted its funding is explained.

Further, the history of the Kruger Telegram, Boer War, Boxer Rebellion and the assassination of Archduke Franz Ferdinand and its aftermath are presented. From Margot Asquith, wife of Prime Minister H. H. Asquith, speaking of meeting her husband after the last efforts to avert war had failed, we are given, "I sat down beside him with a feeling of numbness in my limbs.... Henry sat at his writing table leaning back.... What was he thinking of?... His sons?... would they all have to fight?... I got up and leaned my head against his; we could not speak for tears."

== Table of contents ==
- Part I: The German Challenge
- Part II: The End of Splendid Isolation
- Part III: The Navy
- Part IV: Britain and Germany: Politics and Growing Tension, 1906–1910
- Part V: The Road to Armageddon
