= Main deck =

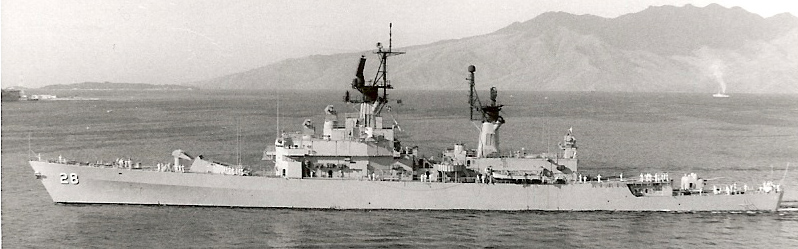
The main deck of USS Wainwright supports the 5"/54 gun aft, but is not the weather deck for the greater length of the forward portion of the ship.

The main deck of a ship is the uppermost complete deck extending from bow to stern. A steel ship's hull may be considered a structural beam with the main deck forming the upper flange of a box girder and the keel forming the lower strength member. The main deck may act as a tension member when the ship is supported by a single wave amidships, or as a compression member when the ship is supported between waves forward and aft.
