= Castles of Steel =

2003 book by Robert K. Massie

Castles of Steel: Britain, Germany, and the Winning of the Great War at Sea
- Author: Robert K. Massie
- Language: English
- Genre: Non-fiction
- Publisher: Ballantine Books
- Publication date: 2003
- Publication place: England
- Media type: Print
- Pages: 880 pp
- ISBN: 978-0679456711
- OCLC: 57134223
- Preceded by: Dreadnought: Britain, Germany, and the Coming of the Great War

Castles of Steel: Britain, Germany, and the Winning of the Great War at Sea is a work of non-fiction by Pulitzer Prize-winner Robert K. Massie. It narrates the major naval actions of the First World War with an emphasis on those of the United Kingdom and Imperial Germany. The term "castles of steel" was coined by the British First Lord of the Admiralty Winston Churchill in reference to the large number of the Royal Navy's battleships he saw at Spithead in 1914.

== Summary ==
The book begins in the lead-up to the declaration of hostilities between Germany and Britain, whereas Massie's previous work Dreadnought: Britain, Germany, and the coming of the Great War ended with the beginning of the war. All the significant naval strategies and battles of World War I are covered, including the Battle of Coronel, where a German squadron led by Admiral Maximilian von Spee destroyed a weaker British cruiser squadron under the command of Admiral Sir Christopher Cradock; the ensuing Battle of the Falkland Islands where Spee's force was annihilated by a superior British squadron; the Battle of Dogger Bank (1915); Naval operations in the Dardanelles Campaign; and a detailed multichapter narrative of the Battle of Jutland and its aftermath.

Other chapters describe German submarine warfare and events triggering America's entry into the war. There are also chapters dedicated to central personalities such as British Admirals John Jellicoe and David Beatty and the German Admirals Franz von Hipper and Reinhard Scheer. The book ends with an account of the scuttling of the German High Seas Fleet in Scapa Flow.

== Reception ==
The book was reviewed by historian Ben Pimlott in The Guardian, historian Gary Sheffield in The Independent, historian Max Boot in The New York Times, The New Yorker, and Publishers Weekly.

== Editions ==
- Massie, Robert Kinloch (2003). Castles of Steel: Britain Germany, and the Winning of the Great War at Sea. New York: Ballantine Books. ISBN 0-345-40878-0.
