= HMS King Alfred (1901) =

Cruiser of the Royal Navy

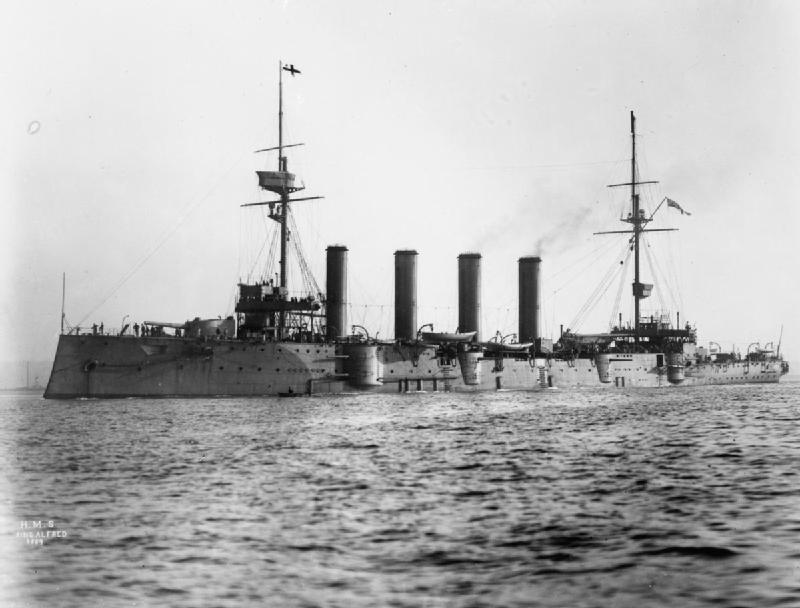
- King Alfred during the First World War

History

United Kingdom
- Name: HMS King Alfred
- Namesake: Alfred the Great, King of Wessex
- Builder: Vickers Limited, Barrow-in-Furness
- Laid down: 11 August 1899
- Launched: 28 October 1901
- Christened: Countess of Lathom
- Completed: 22 December 1903
- Fate: Sold for scrap, 30 January 1920

General characteristics
- Class & type: Drake-class armoured cruiser
- Displacement: 14,150 long tons (14,380 t) (normal)
- Length: 533 ft 6 in (162.6 m) (o/a)
- Beam: 71 ft 4 in (21.7 m)
- Draught: 26 ft (7.9 m)
- Installed power: 30,000 ihp (22,000 kW); 43 Belleville boilers
- Propulsion: 2 × shafts; 2 × 4-cylinder triple-expansion steam engines
- Speed: 23 knots (43 km/h; 26 mph)
- Complement: 900
- Armament: 2 × single BL 9.2-inch Mk X guns; 16 × single BL 6-inch Mk VII guns; 12 × single QF 12-pdr 12-cwt guns (Note: "Cwt" is the abbreviation for hundredweight, 12 cwt referring to the weight of the gun.); 3 × 3-pounder Hotchkiss guns; 2 × single 18-inch torpedo tubes
- Armour: Belt: 2–6 in (51–152 mm); Decks: 1–2.5 in (25–64 mm); Barbettes: 6 in (152 mm); Turrets: 6 in (150 mm); Conning tower: 12 in (305 mm); Bulkheads: 5 in (127 mm)

HMS King Alfred was one of four Drake-class armoured cruisers built for the Royal Navy around 1900. She served as flagship of the China Station from 1906 until relieved in 1910. Upon her return home that year, she was placed in reserve before being recommissioned in mid-1914. She was assigned to the 6th Cruiser Squadron of the Grand Fleet at the beginning of World War I. She was transferred to the 9th Cruiser Squadron in 1915 and assigned to convoy protection duties by the end of the year. King Alfred participated in the unsuccessful searches for the German commerce raider SMS Möwe in 1916–17 before beginning to escort convoys later that year. The ship was torpedoed by a German submarine in 1918, but returned to service. She was sold for scrap in 1920.

== Design and description ==
King Alfred was designed to displace 14,150 long tons (14,380 t). The ship had an overall length of 553 feet 6 inches (168.7 m), a beam of 71 feet 4 inches (21.7 m) and a deep draught of 26 feet 9 inches (8.2 m). She was powered by two 4-cylinder triple-expansion steam engines, each driving one shaft, which produced a total of 30,000 indicated horsepower (22,000 kW) and gave a maximum speed of 23 knots (43 km/h; 26 mph). The engines were powered by 43 Belleville boilers. She carried a maximum of 2,500 long tons (2,500 t) of coal and her complement consisted of 900 officers and ratings.

Her main armament consisted of two breech-loading (BL) 9.2-inch (234 mm) Mk X guns in single gun turrets, one each fore and aft of the superstructure. They fired 380-pound (170 kg) shells to a range of 15,500 yards (14,200 m). Her secondary armament of sixteen BL 6-inch Mk VII guns was arranged in casemates amidships. Eight of these were mounted on the main deck and were only usable in calm weather. They had a maximum range of approximately 12,200 yards (11,200 m) with their 100-pound (45 kg) shells. A dozen quick-firing (QF) 12-pounder 12 cwt guns were fitted for defence against torpedo boats. Two additional 12-pounder 8 cwt guns could be dismounted for service ashore. King Alfred also carried three 3-pounder Hotchkiss guns and two submerged 17.72-inch (450 mm) torpedo tubes.

By April 1918, the ship had all of the lower casemates for her six-inch guns plated over and six of them remounted on the upper deck so they could be used in heavy weather. Several twelve-pounders were removed to make room for the six-inch guns.

The ship's waterline armour belt had a maximum thickness of 6 inches (152 mm) and was closed off by 5-inch (127 mm) transverse bulkheads. The armour of the gun turrets and their barbettes was 6 inches thick while the casemate armour was 5 inches thick. The protective deck armour ranged in thickness from 1–2.5 inches (25–64 mm) and the conning tower was protected by 12 inches (305 mm) of armour.

== Construction and service ==
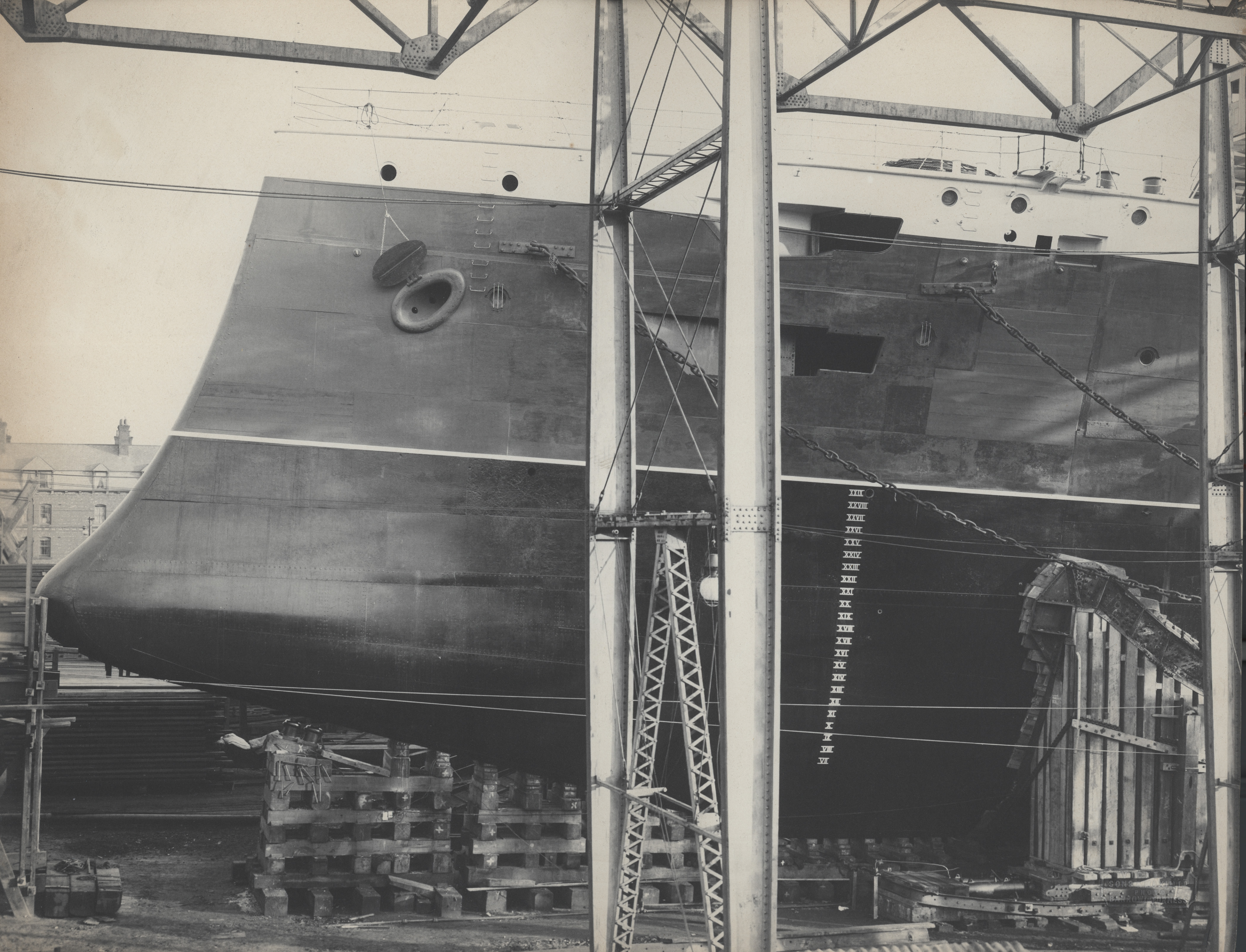
The ram bow of King Alfred under construction

King Alfred, named after Alfred the Great, Anglo-Saxon King of Wessex, was laid down on 11 August 1899 by Vickers, Sons & Maxim at their shipyard in Barrow-in-Furness and launched on 28 October 1901, when she was named by the Countess of Lathom. She left Barrow for Portsmouth in early June 1902, and was completed on 22 December 1903.

After commissioning, she ran aground off Shoeburyness on 5 May 1905. She became flagship of the China Station in 1906 and remained there until 1910. Upon her return home she was assigned to the reserve 2nd Fleet. On 18 June 1910 King Alfred collided with the collier Cheapside off Start Point, Devon, sinking Cheapside, although King Alfred received little damage. On 31 July 1913, King Alfred, which together with sister ships Good Hope and Drake and the light cruisers Active and Amphion, had left Grimsby that morning to take part in naval manoeuvres, collided with the Spanish steamer Umbre.Umbre sank within 75 minutes, with her crew rescued by King Alfred. The owners of Umbre took legal action for damages, and in the resultant court case, judgement was made in favour of Umbre's owners, with blame placed on King Alfred.

When recommissioned in 1914, King Alfred was assigned to the 6th Cruiser Squadron, together with her sister ship, Drake, and was briefly deployed at the beginning of the war to blockade the northern exit from the North Sea. She was transferred to the 9th Cruiser Squadron in October 1915. By January 1916, the squadron, under the command of Rear Admiral Archibald Moore in King Alfred, was patrolling the western entrance to the Strait of Gibraltar and unsuccessfully searching for the commerce raider SMS Möwe. The raider evaded all the British ships and returned to Germany before sortieing again into the Atlantic in late November. In the meantime, Rear Admiral Sydney Fremantle hoisted his flag in King Alfred on 22 September, succeeding Moore. When the Admiralty received word that Möwe was loose in the Atlantic in early December, Fremantle ordered his ships to patrol the eastern trade routes, but the raider slipped through the gap between squadrons. When the sweep was concluded, the ship returned to Freetown on 25 December. Fremantle was relieved by Rear Admiral Thomas Sheppard three days later. On her return voyage in March 1917, Möwe passed through the squadron's patrol area without being spotted. In July King Alfred arrived at Devonport to begin a refit that was completed on 13 August. She escorted convoys from Dakar and Freetown to Plymouth for the rest of the year. In February 1918 she began escorting troop convoys from Halifax. The ship was torpedoed by UB-86 on 11 April 1918, north of Ireland, killing one man. She was repaired in Liverpool and returned to service. She was sold for scrap on 30 January 1920 and broken up in the Netherlands.

== Bibliography ==
- Chesneau, Roger & Kolesnik, Eugene M., eds. (1979). Conway's All the World's Fighting Ships 1860–1905. Greenwich: Conway Maritime Press. ISBN 0-8317-0302-4.
- Corbett, Julian (1997). Naval Operations. History of the Great War: Based on Official Documents. Vol. III (reprint of the 1940 second ed.). London and Nashville, Tennessee: Imperial War Museum in association with the Battery Press. ISBN 1-870423-50-X.
- Friedman, Norman (2012). British Cruisers of the Victorian Era. Barnsley, South Yorkshire, UK: Seaforth. ISBN 978-1-59114-068-9.
- Friedman, Norman (2011). Naval Weapons of World War One. Barnsley, South Yorkshire, UK: Seaforth. ISBN 978-1-84832-100-7.
- Gardiner, Robert & Gray, Randal, eds. (1985). Conway's All the World's Fighting Ships 1906–1921. Annapolis, Maryland: Naval Institute Press. ISBN 0-85177-245-5.
- Newbolt, Henry (1996). Naval Operations. History of the Great War Based on Official Documents. Vol. IV (reprint of the 1928 ed.). Nashville, Tennessee: Battery Press. ISBN 0-89839-253-5.
- "Transcript: HMS KING ALFRED - September 1915 to May 1918, Central & North Atlantic, British waters". Royal Navy Log Books of the World War 1 Era. Naval-History.net.
- Silverstone, Paul H. (1984). Directory of the World's Capital Ships. New York: Hippocrene Books. ISBN 0-88254-979-0.
