= Christopher Cradock =

British Admiral of the Royal Navy (1862–1914)

Rear-Admiral Sir Christopher Cradock KCVO CB SGM
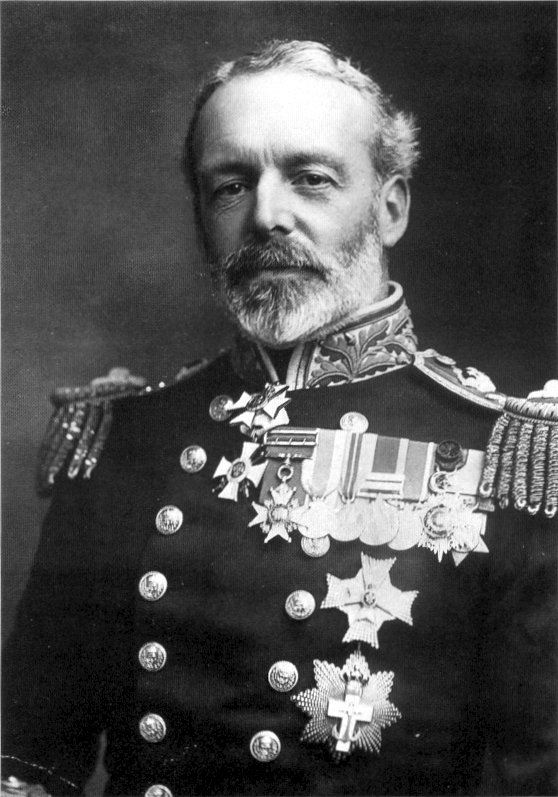
- Born: 2 July 1862; Hartforth, North Yorkshire, England
- Died: 1 November 1914 (aged 52); HMS Good Hope, off Coronel, Chile
- Military career
- Allegiance: United Kingdom
- Branch: Royal Navy
- Service years: 1875–1914
- Rank: Rear-Admiral
- Commands: HMS Alacrity; HMS Andromeda; HMS Bacchante; HMS Leviathan; HMS Swiftsure; Royal Naval Barracks, Portsmouth; North America and West Indies Station
- Conflicts: Boxer Rebellion: Battle of the Taku Forts (1900); World War I: Naval campaign; Atlantic Ocean campaign; Battle of Coronel †
- Awards: Knight Commander of the Royal Victorian Order; Companion of the Order of the Bath; Order of the Crown (Prussia)

Rear-Admiral Sir Christopher George Francis Maurice Cradock KCVO CB SGM (2 July 1862 – 1 November 1914) was an English senior officer of the Royal Navy. He earned a reputation for great gallantry.

Appointed to the royal yacht, he was close to the British royal family. Prior to the First World War, his combat service during the Mahdist War and the Boxer Rebellion was all ashore. Appointed Commander-in-Chief of the North America and West Indies Station before the war, his mission was to protect Allied merchant shipping by hunting down German commerce raiders.

Late in 1914 he was tasked to search for and destroy the East Asia Squadron of the Imperial German Navy as it headed home around the tip of South America. Believing that he had no choice but to engage the squadron in accordance with his orders, despite his numerical and tactical inferiority, he was killed during the Battle of Coronel off the coast of Chile in November when the German ships sank his flagship.

== Early life and career ==
Cradock was born at Hartforth, Richmond, North Riding of Yorkshire, on 2 July 1862, the fourth son of Christopher and Georgina Cradock (née Duff). He joined the Royal Navy's cadet training ship HMS Britannia on 15 January 1875 and was appointed to the armoured corvette HMS Pallas of the Mediterranean Station on 22 December 1876. Cradock was promoted to midshipman on 22 December 1877 and was present when the British occupied the island of Cyprus the following year. He was transferred to the ironclad HMS Minotaur on 25 July 1879 and then to the corvette HMS Cleopatra on the China Station on 24 August 1880. Promoted to acting sub-lieutenant on 21 December 1881, Cradock returned to England on 6 March 1882 to prepare for his lieutenant's exams which he passed a year later. His rank confirmed, he then passed gunnery and torpedo courses later in 1883.

Cradock was assigned to the ironclad HMS Superb in the Mediterranean after completing his courses and in 1884 was assigned to the naval brigade which had been formed for service during the Mahdist War. After serving in a support role during the war, he returned to his ship where he was promoted to lieutenant on 30 June 1885. Cradock was then appointed to the gunboat HMS Linnet as her first lieutenant and remained there until he was placed on half-pay on 9 May 1889. He was briefly recalled to active duty aboard the new battleship HMS Howe to help during her shakedown cruise and to prepare her for the fleet review in Spithead in August. Cradock then spent a year on the corvette HMS Volage, assigned to the Training Squadron. During this time, he published his first book, Sporting Notes from the East, about the shooting of game.

On 6 September 1890, Cradock was appointed first lieutenant of the sloop-of-war HMS Dolphin which arrived in the Red Sea shortly afterwards. The Mahdist War had flared up again and the British formed the Eastern Sudan Field Force around the garrison at Suakin, on Sudan's Red Sea coast. Cradock was assigned to the force in 1891 and participated in the capture of Tokar. He then became aide-de-camp to Colonel Charles Holled Smith, Governor-General of the Red Sea Littoral and Commandant, Suakin. For his service in this campaign, he was awarded the Ottoman Empire's Order of the Medjidie, 4th Class and the Khedive's Star with the Tokar Clasp. After returning to Dolphin, Cradock helped to rescue the crew of the Brazilian cruiser Almirante Barroso, which was wrecked on the coast of the Red Sea near Ras Zeith on 21 May 1893 during an around-the-world cadet cruise.

After a brief time on half-pay and another gunnery course, Cradock was appointed to the royal yacht Victoria and Albert on 31 August 1894 and published his second book, Wrinkles in Seamanship, or, Help to a Salt Horse. He served as a pallbearer at the funeral of Prince Henry of Battenberg on 5 February 1896. Promoted to commander on 31 August, he became the second-in-command of HMS Britannia. Before the beginning of the Second Boer War in October 1899, Cradock was briefly transferred to the drill ship President to serve as a transport officer, supervising the loading of troops and supplies for South Africa, and was reduced to half-pay before the end of the year.

=== Command and flag rank ===
On 1 February 1900 he was appointed in command of the third-class cruiser HMS Alacrity, which was posted later that year to the China Station during the Boxer Rebellion. He commanded a mixture of British, German and Japanese sailors during the capture of the Taku forts on 17 June, led a contingent of British and Italian sailors into the Tientsin on 23 June, and then led the naval brigade that relieved Vice-Admiral Edward Seymour's troops besieged in the Pei-yang Arsenal three days later. Cradock was promoted to captain effective 18 April 1901 and also received the Prussian Order of the Crown, 2nd Class with swords as a result of his actions. Alacrity arrived back in Britain in July 1901 and Cradock was placed on half-pay.

On 24 March 1902 he was posted to the protected cruiser HMS Andromeda on the Mediterranean Station, where from June that year he served as flag captain to Rear-Admiral Sir Baldwin Wake Walker, who commanded the fleet's cruiser squadron. Cradock was appointed a Companion of the Order of the Bath on 26 June. He assumed command of the armoured cruiser HMS Bacchante on 20 December as Wake Walker shifted his flag to the ship, and Andromeda returned home. When King Edward VII visited Malta on 2 June 1903, he appointed Cradock a Member of the Royal Victorian Order. Off the coast of Sardinia, Cradock saved Prince Vudhijaya Chalermlabha, then serving as a midshipman in the Royal Navy, from drowning in April 1904. After the Dogger Bank Incident, Wake Walker commanded the cruisers, including Bacchante, shadowing the Russian Baltic Fleet as it steamed through the Mediterranean in October en route to the Far East. On 17 January 1905, Cradock assumed command of the armoured cruiser HMS Leviathan, but was invalided home on 17 June. He was on sick leave until September and was then placed on half-pay.

Cradock became captain of the battleship HMS Swiftsure on 17 July 1906 and was relieved on 6 August 1908, publishing his last book, Whispers from the Fleet, in 1907. During this time the Royal Navy was riven by the feud between the reforming First Sea Lord, Admiral Jackie Fisher and the traditionalist Admiral Lord Charles Beresford and their followers. While Cradock's position on the issues dividing the navy are not positively known, a passage from Whispers from the Fleet may offer a clue: "... we require – and quickly too – some strong Imperial body of men who will straightway choke the irrepressible utterings of a certain class of individuals who, to their shame, are endeavouring to break down the complete loyalty and good comradeship that now exists in the service between the officers and the men; and who are also willing to commit the heinous crime of trifling with the sacred laws of naval discipline". After leaving command, he was again put on half-pay. He was appointed Naval Aide-de-Camp to Edward VII in February 1909 although he remained on half-pay. On 1 July Cradock was appointed in command of the Royal Naval Barracks, Portsmouth and promoted to Commodore second class while retaining his duties as aide-de-camp. Edward VII died on 6 May 1910 and Cradock stayed on until the end of October to assist his newly crowned son, King George V.

In the meantime he had been promoted to rear-admiral on 24 August 1910, and was relieved of his command in October. Still on half-pay Cradock reported to the Royal Hospital Haslar on 24 February 1911 with kidney troubles and discharged himself on 7 March to attend a staff course at the Royal Naval War College at Portsmouth that lasted until 23 June. He came in sixth out of seven students, and was noted as "very attentive, but sick 1/3 of the term". On the 24th Cradock escorted visitors aboard a merchant ship to the Coronation Fleet Review at Spithead. He became second-in-command of the Atlantic Fleet on 29 August, hoisting his flag aboard the predreadnought battleship HMS London. When the ocean liner SS Delhi ran aground during the night of 12/13 December near Cape Spartel, Morocco, smashing all of her lifeboats, Cradock was ordered to take London and the armoured cruiser HMS Duke of Edinburgh to rescue the survivors in heavy seas. It took five days to get all of the passengers and crewmen off the ship, including Alexander Duff, 1st Duke of Fife, his wife, the Princess Royal, and the king's granddaughters. In recognition of his efforts, he was appointed a Knight Commander of the Royal Victorian Order on 28 February 1912 and later awarded the Sea Gallantry Medal.

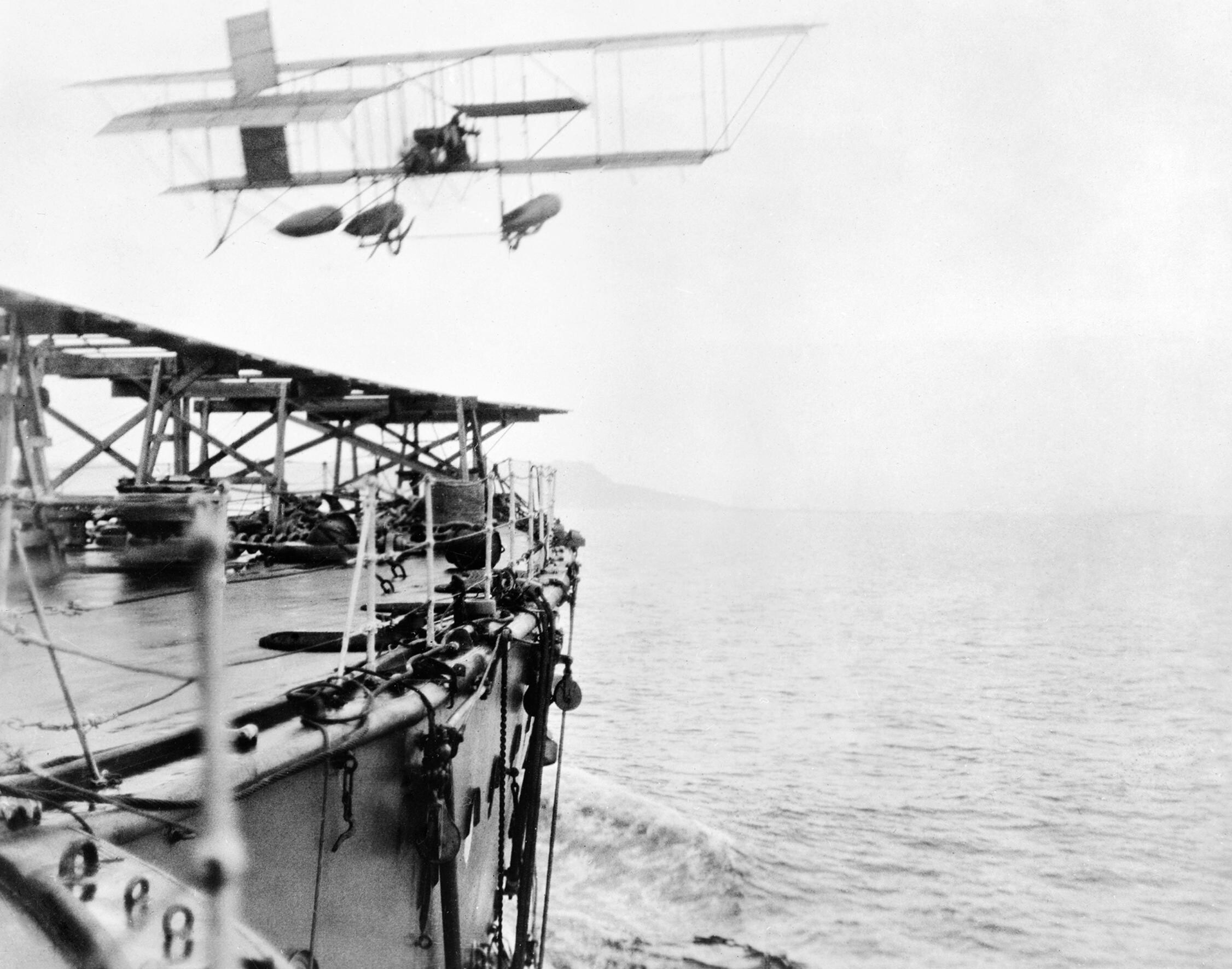
The first take-off by an aeroplane from a moving ship, 2 May 1912. Hibernia's bow and flying-off ramp at bottom left.

In May Cradock shifted his flag to the predreadnought battleship HMS Hibernia where he took charge of experiments that the RN was conducting with launching aircraft from ships. Commander Charles Samson had already flown off from Hibernia's sister ship HMS Africa while anchored earlier and she transferred her flying-off equipment to Hibernia, including a runway constructed over her forecastle above her forward 12-inch turret that stretched from her bridge to her bows. Samson took off from Hibernia in his Short Improved S.27 biplane while the ship steamed at 10.5 knots (19.4 km/h; 12.1 mph) in front of George V at the Royal Fleet Review in Weymouth Bay on 9 May, the first person to take off from a moving ship. Cradock hauled down his flag on 29 August and went on half-pay.

On 8 February 1913, he was given command of the 4th Cruiser Squadron, formerly the North America and West Indies Station (the main base remaining the Royal Naval Dockyard and the Admiralty House at the North Atlantic Imperial fortress colony of Bermuda, and hoisted his flag in the armoured cruisers HMS Donegal then to HMS Suffolk. His orders from the Admiralty were to protect British lives and property during the ongoing Mexican Revolution, but to avoid any action that could be construed as British interference in internal Mexican affairs. The British Minister to Mexico, Sir Lionel Carden strongly disagreed with the official policy and argued for some sort of intervention. The situation was further confused by American suspicion of British actions, believing that the Monroe Doctrine meant that the Americans alone could intervene in Mexico.

Together with the American Rear Admiral Frank Friday Fletcher, Cradock coordinated the evacuation of British and American citizens from Tampico, Mexico, when that city was threatened by rebels. He then transferred his flag to HMS Essex on 18 February 1914 and sailed to Galveston, Texas, where he arrived at the end of the month. There he visited some of the refugees and was feted by the Americans, including a visit with the Governor of Texas, Oscar Colquitt before returning to Mexican waters. Cradock was in Tampico, when the Mexican Army briefly arrested nine American sailors who were purchasing petrol in the city on 9 April. Rear Admiral Henry T. Mayo, commander of the American forces off-shore, demanded an apology, but the Mexican government refused. The incident contributed to the American decision to occupy Veracruz on 21 April. Cradock was able to evacuate some 1,500 refugees from Tampico, Mexico City and Veracruz without incident.

=== First World War ===
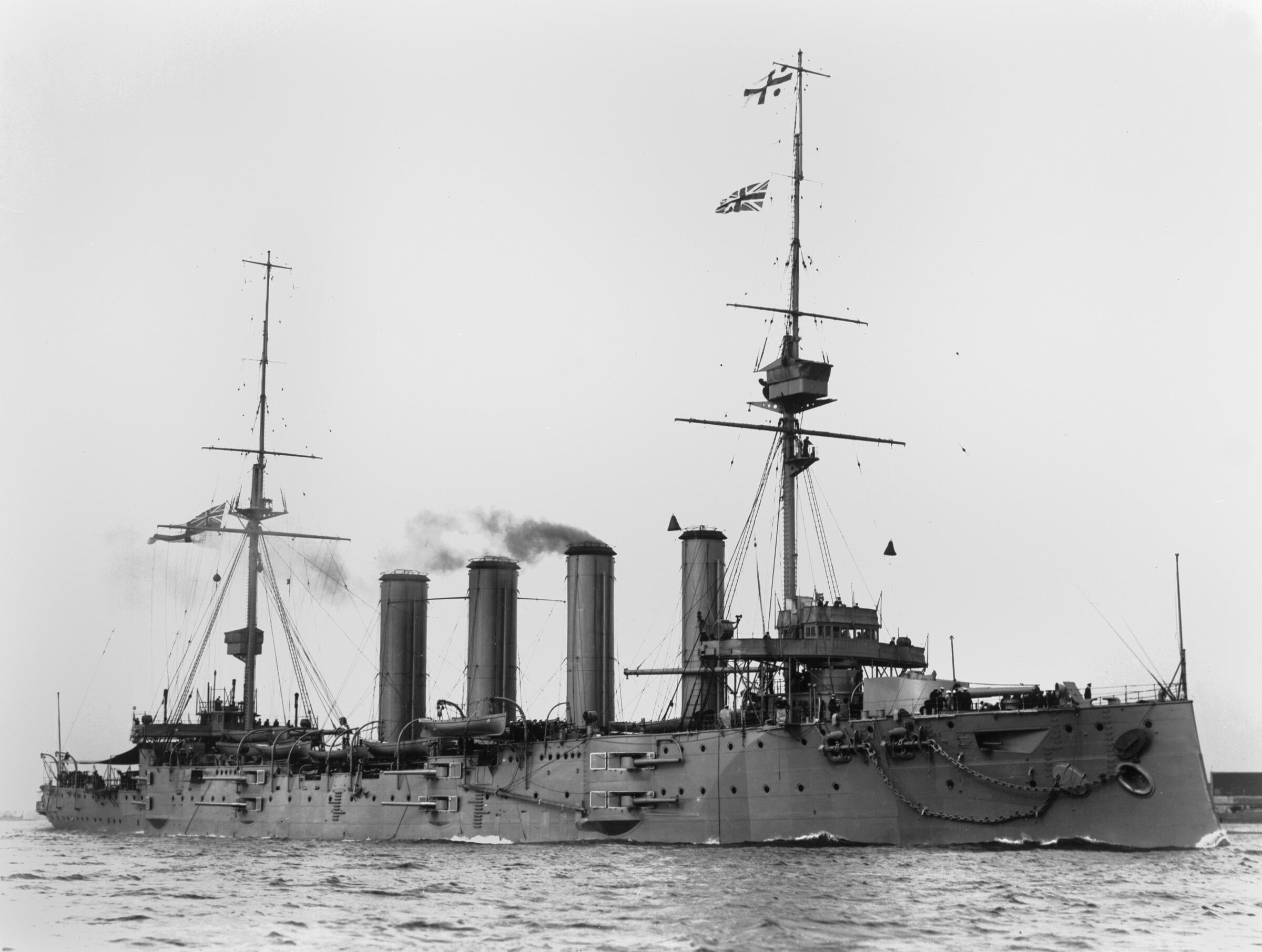
Having flown his flag in HMS Suffolk, Cradock transferred to the armoured cruiser HMS Good Hope (pictured) in late August 1914

When the preliminary warning of war with Germany reached Cradock on 27 July, there were two German light cruisers in his area. The brand-new SMS Karlsruhe had just arrived to replace SMS Dresden. Cradock dispersed his cruisers to find and track the German ships, but the Admiralty was concerned about the presence of numerous ocean liners in New York that could be converted into armed merchant cruisers, so they ordered him to concentrate three of his cruisers off New York harbour. He sent two of his ships northwards and followed them in Suffolk before the declaration of war on 4 August.

On the morning of 6 August, Suffolk spotted Karlsruhe in the process of transferring guns and equipment to the liner SS Kronprinz Wilhelm about 120 nmi (220 km; 140 mi) north of Watling Island. The two German ships quickly departed in different directions. Suffolk followed Karlsruhe, and Craddock ordered the light cruiser Bristol to intercept her. Karlsruhe's faster speed allowed her to quickly outpace Suffolk, but Bristol caught her that evening and fruitlessly fired at her before the German ship disengaged in the darkness. Craddock had anticipated her manoeuvres and continued eastwards, but Karlsruhe was almost out of coal and had slowed down to her most economical speed and passed behind Suffolk the following morning without being spotted before putting into Puerto Rico with only 12 long tons (12 t) of coal remaining.

Cradock continued northward in obedience to his orders and, after rendezvousing with the newly arrived armoured cruiser HMS Good Hope in Halifax, transferred his flag to her because she was faster than Suffolk. Dresden was ordered to rendezvous with the East Asia Squadron under Vice-Admiral Graf Maximilian von Spee in the Pacific. Karlsruhe was sent to intercept Allied merchantmen off the north-eastern coast of Brazil. So the reported losses of shipping showed both ships moving south. In response, the Admiralty ordered Cradock southward on 22 August, put him in command of the South American Station the following month, and reinforcing his fleet with the elderly and slow pre-dreadnought battleship HMS Canopus. Good Hope was coaled at the Royal Naval Dockyard, Bermuda (by Bermuda Militia Artillery gunners assisting with coaling).

On 14 September, Cradock received new orders from the Admiralty. They apprised him that the East Asia Squadron was probably heading for either the west coast of South America or the Strait of Magellan. He was to detach sufficient force to deal with Dresden and Karlsruhe while concentrating his remaining ships to meet the Germans, using Port Stanley in the Falkland Islands to re-coal. To achieve this aim, he was to be reinforced by the modern armoured cruiser HMS Defence arriving from the Mediterranean. Until she arrived, Cradock was to keep Canopus and one Monmouth-class cruiser with his flagship, Good Hope. Once he had superior force, he was to search for and destroy the German cruisers and break up German trade on the west coast, while remaining prepared to fall back and cover the River Plate area.

The day that the Admiralty issued this order, the East Asia Squadron appeared at occupied German Samoa. Noting this apparent movement to the west, and the continuing depredations of the light cruiser SMS Emden in the Bay of Bengal, the Admiralty concluded that von Spee meant to rendezvous with Emden in the southwestern Pacific, and cancelled the transfer of Defence to Cradock's command. Two days later, the Admiralty messaged Cradock that von Spee was moving away from South America, and that he should search the southwestern coast of South America for German ships without worrying about keeping his ships concentrated. But they failed to inform him that Defence would not now be sent to him.

By late September, it had become clear that Dresden had passed into the Pacific Ocean. Cradock's ships fruitlessly searched several different anchorages in the area of Tierra del Fuego, and returned to Port Stanley to re-coal on 3 October. Based on intercepted radio signals, the Admiralty decided that the East Asia Squadron was probably headed east, and so advised him two days later, although he did not receive the message until 7 October.

=== The Hunt for the East Asia Squadron ===
By late October Cradock had reliable intelligence that the East Asia Squadron had reached the western coast of South America. Cradock's fleet was significantly weaker than Spee's, mainly consisting of elderly vessels manned by largely inexperienced crews. However, the orders he received from the Admiralty were ambiguous; although they were meant to make him concentrate his ships on the old battleship Canopus, Cradock interpreted them as instructing him to seek and engage the enemy forces. Clarifying instructions from the Admiralty were not issued until 3 November, by which time the battle had already been fought.

==== Battle of Coronel ====
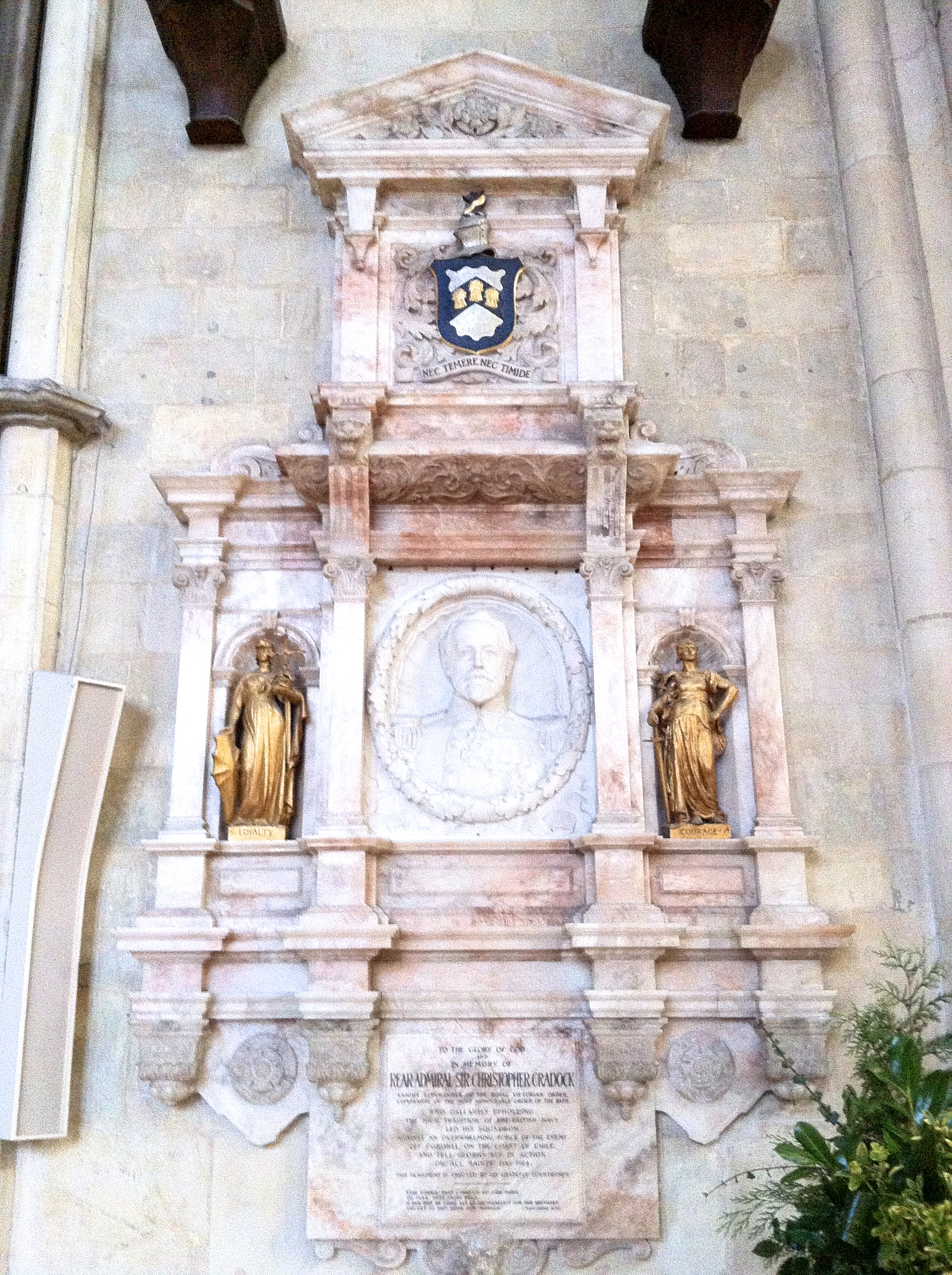
Monument to Sir Christopher Cradock in York Minster

Cradock found Spee's force off Chile in the late afternoon of 1 November, and decided to engage, starting the Battle of Coronel. As it was useless for anything other than searching, he sent the armed merchant cruiser Otranto away. He tried to close the range immediately to engage with his shorter-ranged six-inch guns and so that the enemy would have the setting sun in their eyes, but von Spee kept the range open until dusk, when the British cruisers were silhouetted in the afterglow, while his ships were hidden by darkness. Heavily disadvantaged because the high seas had rendered the main-deck six-inch guns on Good Hope and HMS Monmouth unusable, and with partially trained crews, Cradock's two armoured cruisers were destroyed with the loss of all 1,660 lives, including his own; the light cruiser Glasgow managed to escape. This battle was the first defeat of the Royal Navy in a naval action in more than a hundred years.

Departing from Port Stanley he had left behind a letter to be forwarded to Admiral Hedworth Meux in the event of his death. In this he commented that he did not intend to suffer the fate of Rear-Admiral Ernest Troubridge, who had been court-martialled in August for failing to engage the enemy despite the odds being severely against him, during the pursuit of the German warships Goeben and Breslau. The Governor of the Falklands and the Governor's aide both reported that Cradock had not expected to survive.

A monument to Cradock, sculpted by F. W. Pomeroy, was placed in York Minster on 16 June 1916. It is on the east side of the north transept towards the Chapter House entrance. There is another monument to Cradock in Catherington churchyard, Hampshire. There is a monument and a stained glass window in Cradock's memory in his parish church at Gilling West. Having no known grave, he is commemorated by the Commonwealth War Graves Commission on Portsmouth Naval Memorial. In Portsmouth, VA, USA a neighborhood was named for Adm. Cradock in 1917. Also named for Adm. Cradock was a high school in the Cradock neighborhood from 1917 until 1992. The neighborhood still exists and is still called Cradock. There is still a Cradock Middle School. The neighborhood and schools were named in honor of Adm. Cradock for his assistance to U.S. Naval forces during the Mexican Revolution.

== Personal life ==
Cradock never married, but kept a dog which accompanied him at sea. He commented that he would choose to die either during an accident while hunting (his favourite pastime), or during action at sea.

== Bibliography ==
- Corbett, Julian (March 1997). Naval Operations to the Battle of the Falklands. History of the Great War: Based on Official Documents. Vol. I (2nd, reprint of the 1938 ed.). London and Nashville, Tennessee: Imperial War Museum and Battery Press. ISBN 0-89839-256-X.
- Dunn, Steve R. (2014). The Scapegoat: The Life and Tragedy of a Fighting Admiral and Churchill's Role in his Death. Sussex, UK: The Book Guild. ISBN 978-1-84624-971-6.
- Halpern, Paul S. (1994). A Naval History of World War I. Annapolis, Maryland: Naval Institute Press. ISBN 1-55750-352-4.
- Massie, Robert K. (2003). Castles of Steel: Britain, Germany, and the Winning of the Great War at Sea. New York: Random House. ISBN 0-679-45671-6.
- "Transcript: HMS Essex – January 1914 to August 1916, 4th Cruiser Squadron West Atlantic, North America & West Indies Station, 9th Cruiser Squadron Atlantic (Canary Islands)". Royal Navy Log Books of the World War 1 Era. Naval-History.net.
