= HMS Leviathan (1901) =

Cruiser of the Royal Navy

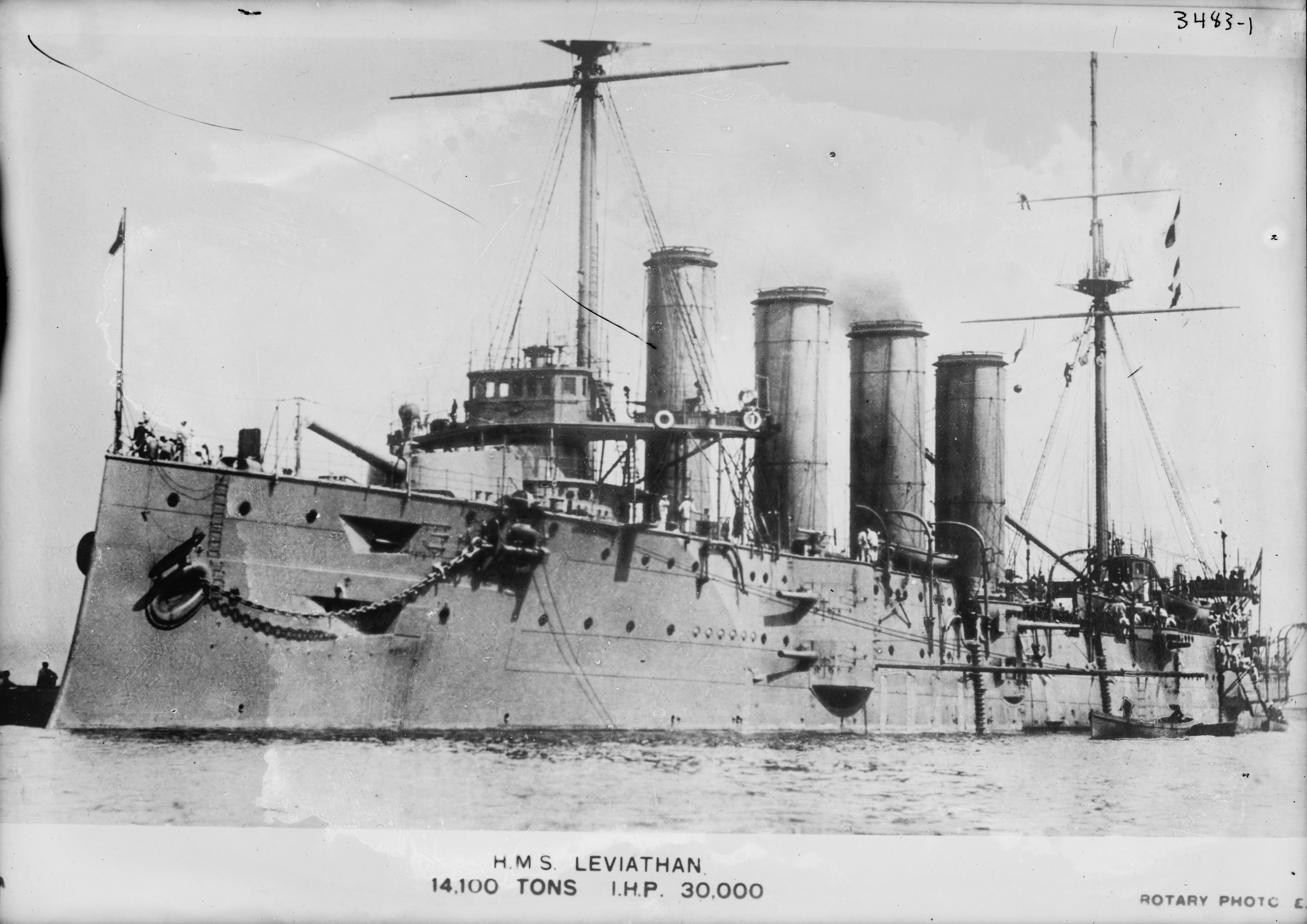
- Leviathan at anchor

History

United Kingdom
- Name: Leviathan
- Namesake: Leviathan
- Builder: John Brown & Company, Clydebank
- Laid down: 30 November 1899
- Launched: 3 July 1901
- Completed: 16 June 1903
- Fate: Sold for scrap, 3 March 1920

General characteristics
- Class & type: Drake-class armoured cruiser
- Displacement: 14,150 long tons (14,380 t) (normal)
- Length: 533 ft 6 in (162.6 m) (o/a)
- Beam: 71 ft 4 in (21.7 m)
- Draught: 26 ft (7.9 m)
- Installed power: 43 Belleville boilers; 30,000 ihp (22,000 kW)
- Propulsion: 2 × shafts; 2 × triple-expansion steam engines
- Speed: 23 knots (43 km/h; 26 mph)
- Complement: 900
- Armament: 2 × single 9.2 in (234 mm) guns; 16 × single 6 in (152 mm) guns; 12 × single 12 pdr 12 cwt guns (Note: "Cwt" is the abbreviation for hundredweight, 12 cwt referring to the weight of the gun.); 3 × 3 pdr Hotchkiss guns; 2 × single 18 in (457 mm) torpedo tubes
- Armour: Belt: 2–6 in (51–152 mm); Decks: 1–2.5 in (25–64 mm); Barbettes: 6 in (152 mm); Turrets: 6 in (150 mm); Conning tower: 12 in (305 mm); Bulkheads: 5 in (127 mm)

HMS Leviathan was one of four Drake-class armoured cruisers built for the Royal Navy around 1900. She was assigned to the China Station upon completion and then served in the Mediterranean Fleet in 1905–06. She was assigned to the 7th Cruiser Squadron in 1907 before she was briefly reduced to reserve. Leviathan was recommissioned in 1909 for service with the 4th Cruiser Squadron before she was placed in reserve in 1913.

Recommissioned in mid-1914, she was assigned to the 6th Cruiser Squadron of the Grand Fleet at the beginning of World War I. She spent most of the rest of the year searching for German commerce raiders and escorting convoys before she became flagship of the 1st Cruiser Squadron. In early 1915, she was reassigned to the 6th Cruiser Squadron before she became flagship of the North America and West Indies Station, based at the Royal Naval Dockyard in the Imperial fortress colony of Bermuda, in March. Leviathan retained that position for the next three years until she was relieved as flagship in early 1918 and began escorting convoys from North America to Britain. She was placed in reserve in 1919 and sold for scrap in early 1920.

== Design and description ==
Leviathan was designed to displace 14,150 long tons (14,380 t). The ship had an overall length of 553 feet 6 inches (168.7 m), a beam of 71 feet 4 inches (21.7 m) and a deep draught of 26 feet 9 inches (8.2 m). She was powered by two 4-cylinder triple-expansion steam engines, each driving one shaft, which produced a total of 30,000 indicated horsepower (22,000 kW) and gave a maximum speed of 23 knots (43 km/h; 26 mph). The engines were powered by 43 Belleville boilers. She carried a maximum of 2,500 long tons (2,500 t) of coal and her complement consisted of 900 officers and ratings.

Her main armament consisted of two breech-loading (BL) 9.2-inch (234 mm) Mk X guns in single gun turrets, one each fore and aft of the superstructure. They fired 380-pound (170 kg) shells to a range of 15,500 yards (14,200 m). Her secondary armament of sixteen BL 6-inch Mk VII guns was arranged in casemates amidships. Eight of these were mounted on the main deck and were only usable in calm weather. They had a maximum range of approximately 12,200 yards (11,200 m) with their 100-pound (45 kg) shells. A dozen quick-firing (QF) 12-pounder 12 cwt guns were fitted for defence against torpedo boats. Two additional 12-pounder 8 cwt guns could be dismounted for service ashore. Leviathan also carried three 3-pounder Hotchkiss guns and two submerged 17.72-inch (450 mm) torpedo tubes.

At some point during the way, the ship probably had all of the lower casemates for her six-inch guns plated over and six of them remounted on the upper deck so they could be used in heavy weather. Several twelve-pounders were removed to make room for the six-inch guns.

The ship's waterline armour belt had a maximum thickness of 6 inches (152 mm) and was closed off by 5-inch (127 mm) transverse bulkheads. The armour of the gun turrets and their barbettes was 6 inches thick while the casemate armour was 5 inches thick. The protective deck armour ranged in thickness from 1–2.5 inches (25–64 mm) and the conning tower was protected by 12 inches (305 mm) of armour.

== Construction and service ==
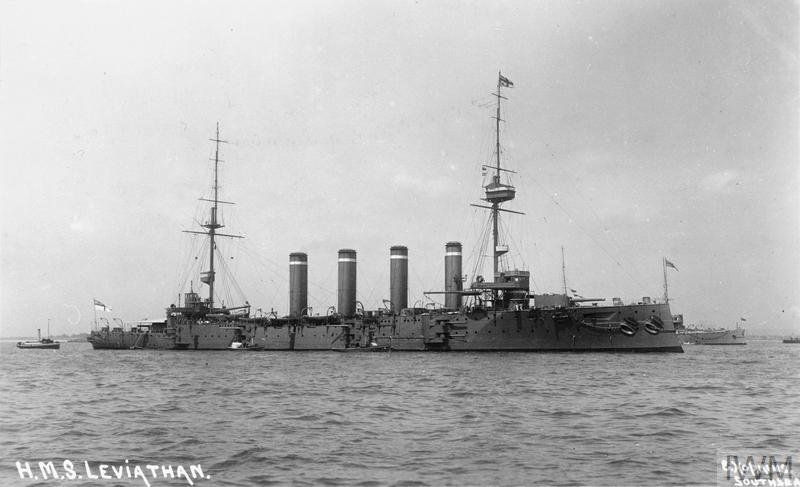
Armoured cruiser HMS Leviathan at Spithead

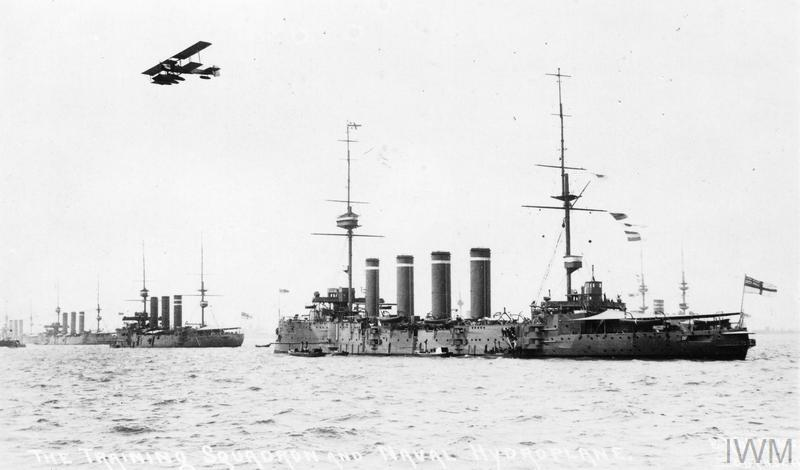
Leviathan and the Training Squadron and a Naval Hydroplane

Leviathan, named after the Biblical sea monster, was laid down by John Brown and Company at their shipyard in Clydebank on 30 November 1899. She was launched on 3 July 1901 when she was christened by Lady Inverclyde, wife of George Burns, 2nd Baron Inverclyde, chairman of the Cunard Steamship Company. The ship sailed to Portsmouth for armament and engine tests in March 1902, and was completed on 16 June 1903 when she was initially assigned to the China Station. Transferred to the Mediterranean Fleet in 1905, she was assigned to the 5th Cruiser Squadron after a refit when she returned home at the end of 1906. She was placed in reserve in 1908, but was recommissioned in 1909 for service with the 4th Cruiser Squadron. Leviathan was again placed in reserve in 1913.

On 15 July 1914 she was recommissioned and assigned to the 6th Cruiser Squadron the following day; she participated in the Fleet Review held on 18–20 July at Spithead. The ship was tasked to hunt down German commerce raiders and was sent to the Azores in early August on a false report of German ships operating there. She was then sent to St. Helena to rendezvous with a troop convoy from South Africa. On the return voyage she had engine problems and put into Gibraltar for repairs on 17 September. Beginning on 11 October, she escorted a convoy from Gibraltar to Milford Haven. On 2 December, she was in Cromarty Firth and hoisted the flag of Rear Admiral Archibald Moore, commander of the 1st Cruiser Squadron. Moore struck his flag on 17 January 1915 and transferred to the battlecruiser New Zealand at Rosyth and the ship rejoined the 6th Cruiser Squadron. On 9 March, she was unsuccessfully attacked by the German submarine U-12 whilst en route to Rosyth to pick up Vice Admiral George Patey, the new Commander-in-Chief, North America and West Indies Station.

The ship arrived at Bermuda on 26 March; while visiting Halifax, Prince Arthur, Duke of Connaught and Strathearn, Governor General of Canada, came aboard and inspected the ship's crew on 16 June. Patey transferred his flag to her sister ship, Drake, on 14 August 1916 while both ships were in Halifax. Vice Admiral Montague Browning relieved Patey and hoisted his flag in the ship on 25 August in Greenock, Scotland. On 8 January 1918, Browning hauled down his flag as he was relieved as commander-in-chief. In March she began escorting convoys from Halifax and New York to the Clyde and Liverpool. She escorted a convoy from New York to Devonport, Devon in November. She was placed in reserve in 1919 and sold for scrap on 3 March 1920 to Hughes Bolckow of Blyth, Northumberland.

== Bibliography ==
- Chesneau, Roger & Kolesnik, Eugene M., eds. (1979). Conway's All the World's Fighting Ships 1860–1905. Greenwich: Conway Maritime Press. ISBN 0-8317-0302-4.
- Colledge, J. J.; Warlow, Ben (2006) [1969]. Ships of the Royal Navy: The Complete Record of All Fighting Ships of the Royal Navy from the 15th Century to the Present (3rd Rev ed.). London: Chatham Publishing. ISBN 978-1-86176-281-8. OCLC 67375475.
- Corbett, Julian. Naval Operations to the Battle of the Falklands. History of the Great War: Based on Official Documents. Vol. I (2nd, reprint of the 1938 ed.). London and Nashville, Tennessee: Imperial War Museum and Battery Press. ISBN 0-89839-256-X.
- Corbett, Julian (1997). Naval Operations. History of the Great War: Based on Official Documents. Vol. II (reprint of the 1929 second ed.). London and Nashville, Tennessee: Imperial War Museum in association with the Battery Press. ISBN 1-870423-74-7.
- Friedman, Norman (2012). British Cruisers of the Victorian Era. Barnsley, South Yorkshire, UK: Seaforth. ISBN 978-1-59114-068-9.
- Friedman, Norman (2011). Naval Weapons of World War One. Barnsley, South Yorkshire, UK: Seaforth. ISBN 978-1-84832-100-7.
- Silverstone, Paul H. (1984). Directory of the World's Capital Ships. New York: Hippocrene Books. ISBN 0-88254-979-0.
- "Transcript: HMS LEVIATHAN - July 1914 to December 1916, 6th, then 1st Cruiser Squadrons (Grand Fleet), North America & West Indies Station (Part 1 of 2)". Royal Navy Log Books of the World War 1 Era. Naval-History.net. Archived from the original on 5 March 2014.
- "Transcript: HMS LEVIATHAN - January 1917 to December 1918, North America & West Indies Station, North Atlantic convoys (Part 2 of 2)". Royal Navy Log Books of the World War 1 Era. Naval-History.net. Archived from the original on 8 July 2014.
