= Drake-class cruiser =

Class of early 20th-century British armoured cruisers

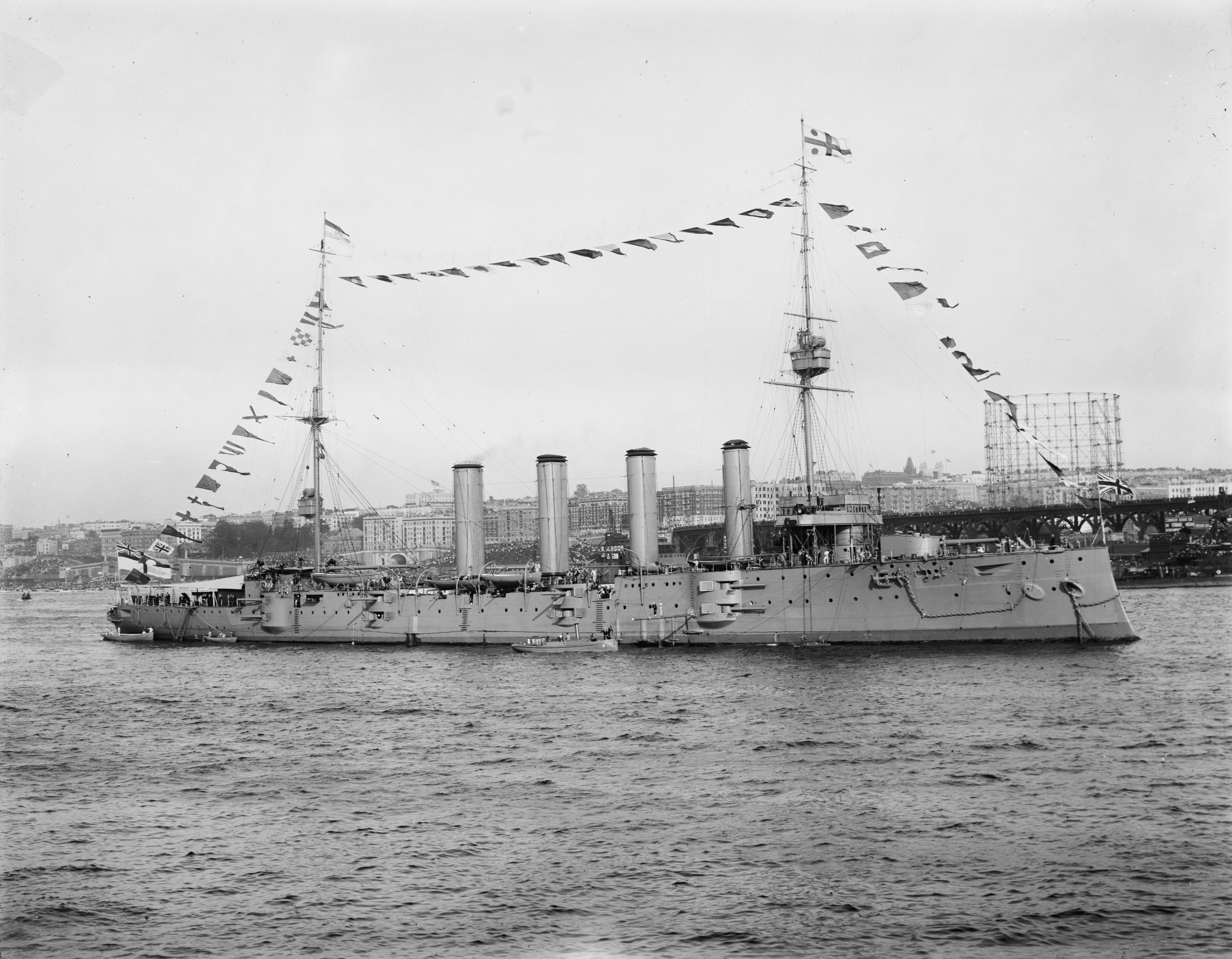
- HMS Drake in 1909

Class overview
- Name: Drake class
- Builders: Fairfield Shipbuilding; John Brown; Pembroke Dockyard; Vickers, Sons & Maxim
- Operators: Royal Navy
- Preceded by: Cressy class
- Succeeded by: Monmouth class
- Built: 1899-1903
- In commission: 1902–1920
- Completed: 4
- Lost: 2
- Scrapped: 2

General characteristics
- Type: Armoured cruiser
- Displacement: 14,150 long tons (14,380 t) (normal)
- Length: 533 ft 6 in (162.6 m) (o/a)
- Beam: 71 ft 4 in (21.7 m)
- Draught: 26 ft (7.9 m)
- Installed power: 43 Belleville boilers; 30,000 ihp (22,000 kW)
- Propulsion: 2 × shafts; 2 × 4-cylinder triple-expansion steam engines
- Speed: 23 knots (43 km/h; 26 mph)
- Complement: 900
- Armament: 2 × single BL 9.2-inch (234 mm) guns; 16 × single BL 6-inch (152 mm) guns; 12 × single QF 12-pounder (3-inch, 76 mm) 12 cwt guns (Note: "Cwt" is the abbreviation for hundredweight, 12 cwt referring to the weight of the gun.); 3 × QF 3-pounder (47 mm) Hotchkiss guns; 2 × single 18-inch (450 mm) torpedo tubes
- Armour: Belt: 2–6 in (51–152 mm); Decks: 1–2.5 in (25–64 mm); Barbettes: 6 in (152 mm); Turrets: 6 in (150 mm); Conning tower: 12 in (305 mm); Bulkheads: 5 in (127 mm)

The Drake class was a four-ship class of armoured cruisers built around 1900 for the Royal Navy.

== Design and description ==
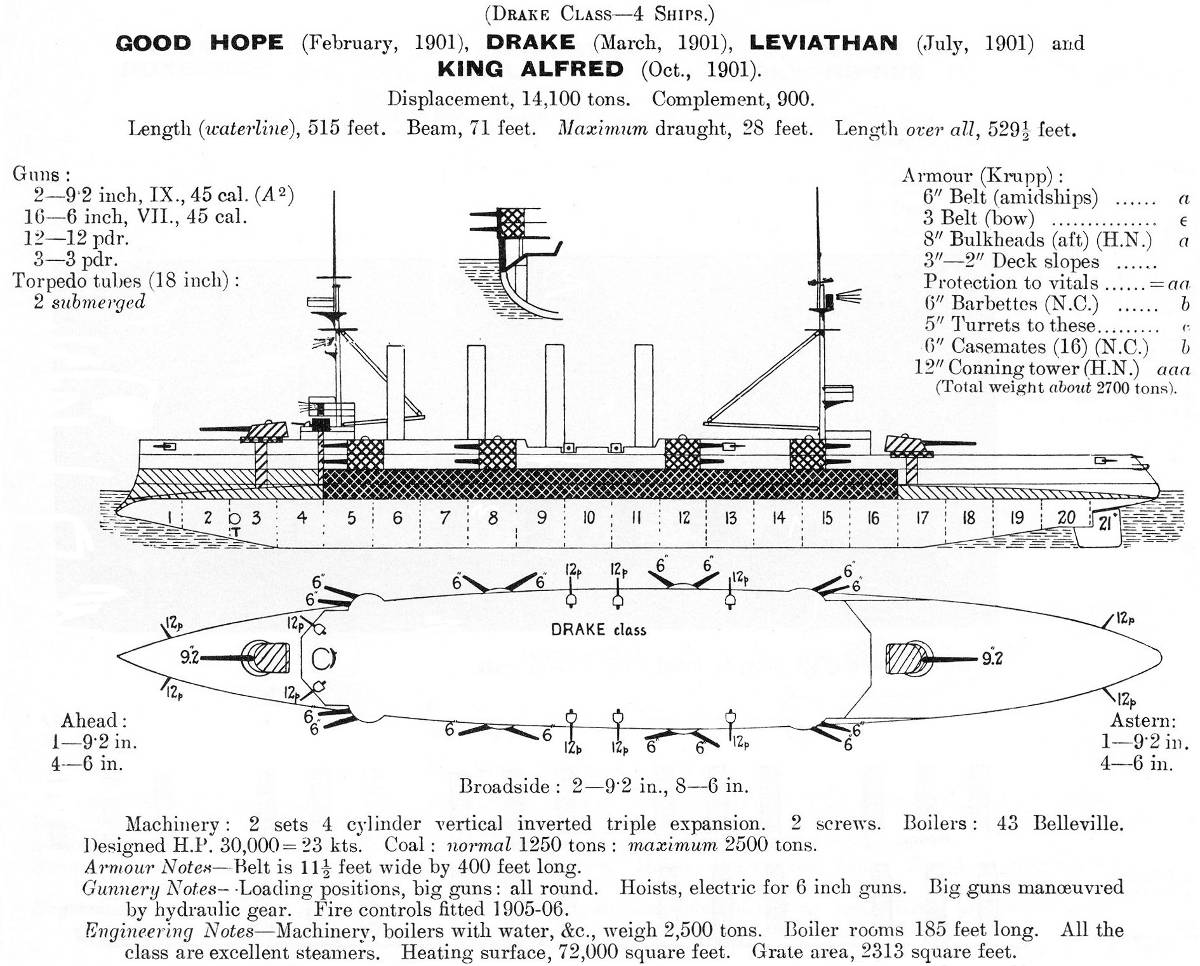
Left elevation and deck plan as depicted in Jane's Fighting Ships 1914

The Drake class were enlarged and improved versions of the Cressy class designed by Sir William White, Chief Constructor of the Royal Navy, to counter the new French armoured cruiser Jeanne d'Arc. The ships had an overall length of 553 feet 6 inches (168.7 m), a beam of 71 feet 4 inches (21.7 m) and a deep draught of 26 feet 9 inches (8.2 m). They displaced 14,150 long tons (14,380 t) and proved to be good seaboats in service. Their crew consisted of 900 officers and other ranks.

The ships were powered by two 4-cylinder triple-expansion steam engines, each driving one shaft, using steam provided by 43 Belleville boilers. The engines produced a total of 30,000 indicated horsepower (22,000 kW) and the Drakes easily reached their designed speed of 23 knots (43 km/h; 26 mph). They carried a maximum of 2,500 long tons (2,500 t) of coal.

The main armament of the Drake-class ships consisted of two breech-loading (BL) 9.2-inch (234 mm) Mk X guns in single gun turrets, one each fore and aft of the superstructure. They fired 380-pound (170 kg) shells to a range of 15,500 yards (14,200 m). The ships' secondary armament of sixteen BL 6-inch Mk VII guns was arranged in casemates amidships. Eight of these were mounted on the main deck and were only usable in calm weather. They had a maximum range of approximately 12,200 yards (11,200 m) with their 100-pound (45.4 kg) shells. A dozen quick-firing (QF) 12-pounder 12 cwt guns were fitted for defence against torpedo boats. Two additional 12-pounder 8 cwt guns could be dismounted for service ashore. The ships also carried three 3-pounder Hotchkiss guns and two submerged 17.7-inch (450 mm) torpedo tubes.

The ship's waterline armour belt had a maximum thickness of 6 inches (152 mm) and was closed off by 5-inch (127 mm) transverse bulkheads. The armour of the gun turrets and their barbettes was 6 inches thick while the casemate armour was 5 inches thick. The protective deck armour ranged in thickness from 1–2.5 inches (25–64 mm) and the conning tower was protected by 12 inches (305 mm) of armour.

== Ships ==
The following table gives the build details and purchase cost of the members of the Drake class. Standard British practice at that time was for these costs to exclude armament and stores. The compilers of The Naval Annual revised costs quoted for British ships between the 1905 and 1906 editions. The reasons for the differences are unclear.

Construction data
Ship	Builder	Date of			Cost according to	
Ship	Builder	Laid down	Launch	Completion	(BNA 1905)	(BNA 1906)
Drake	HM Dockyard, Pembroke	24 Apr 1899	5 Mar 1901	13 Jan 1902	£1,050,625	£1,002,977
Good Hope (ex-Africa)	Fairfield Shipping and Engineering, Govan	11 Sep 1899	21 Feb 1901	8 Nov 1902	£1,023,629	£990,759
King Alfred	Vickers, Sons & Maxim, Barrow-in-Furness	11 Aug 1899	28 Oct 1901	22 Dec 1903	£1,013,772	£978,125
Leviathan	John Brown, Clydebank	30 Nov 1899	3 Jul 1901	16 Jun 1903	£1,043,097	£1,012,959

== Service history ==
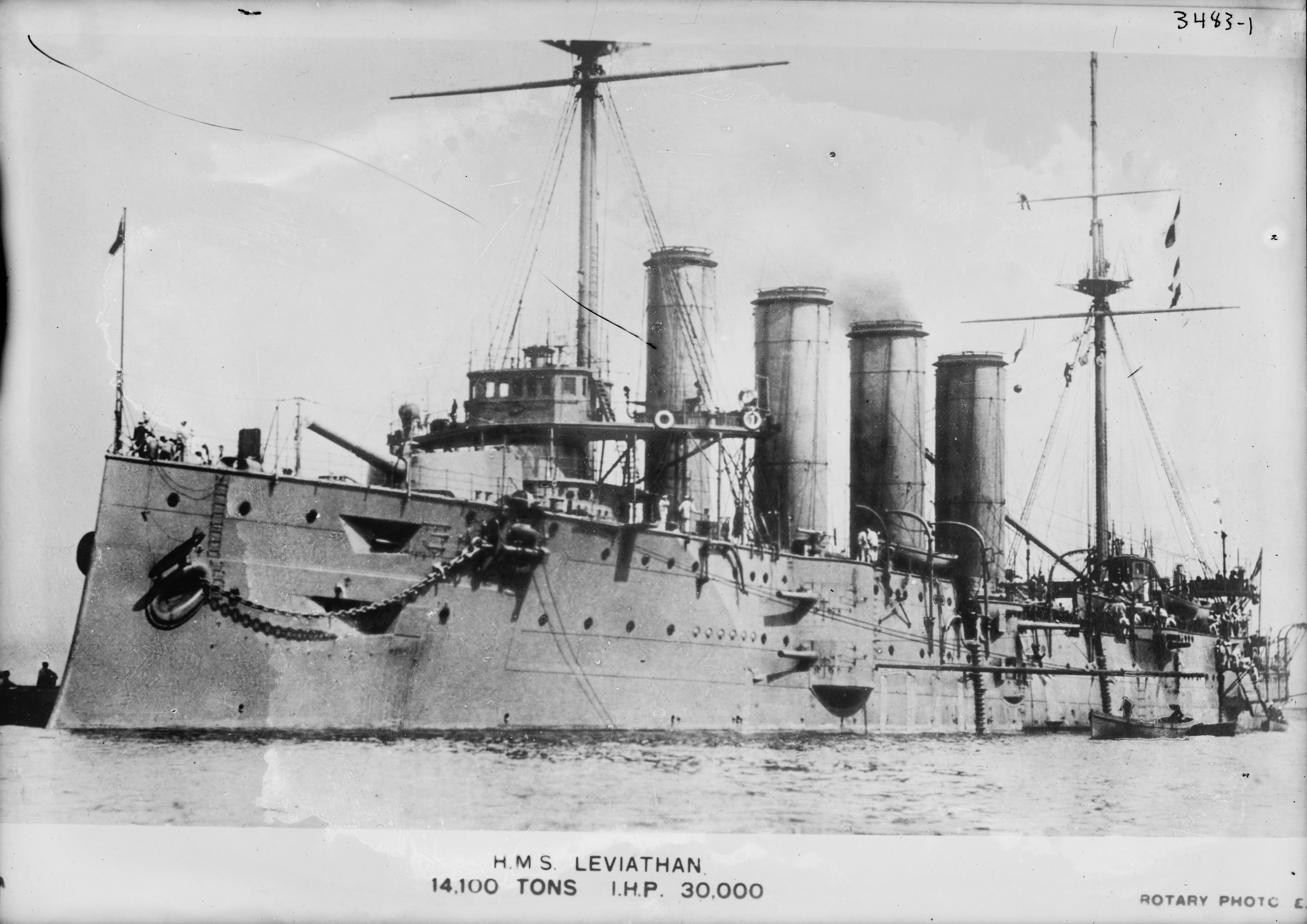
HMS Leviathan

The ships served in the First World War with only two surviving it. Good Hope was sunk at the Battle of Coronel in 1914 and Drake was torpedoed in 1917. Drake was also used to ferry Russian bullion (gold) in October 1914 from Arkhangelsk. The gold (equivalent of $39 million) was security for western loans. The transfer took place at high seas, 30 miles off the coast in the dead of night.

== Bibliography ==
- Brassey, T.A. (ed) The Naval Annual 1905
- Chesneau, Roger & Kolesnik, Eugene M., eds. (1979). Conway's All the World's Fighting Ships 1860–1905. Greenwich: Conway Maritime Press. ISBN 0-8317-0302-4.
- Corbett, Julian (March 1997). Naval Operations to the Battle of the Falklands. History of the Great War: Based on Official Documents. Vol. I (2nd, reprint of the 1938 ed.). London and Nashville, Tennessee: Imperial War Museum and Battery Press. ISBN 0-89839-256-X.
- Friedman, Norman (2012). British Cruisers of the Victorian Era. Barnsley, South Yorkshire, UK: Seaforth. ISBN 978-1-59114-068-9.
- Friedman, Norman (2011). Naval Weapons of World War One. Barnsley, South Yorkshire, UK: Seaforth. ISBN 978-1-84832-100-7.
- Leyland, J. and Brassey, T.A. (ed.) The Naval Annual 1906
- Massie, Robert K. (2004). Castles of Steel: Britain, Germany, and the Winning of the Great War at Sea. London: Jonathan Cape. ISBN 0-224-04092-8.
- Silverstone, Paul H. (1984). Directory of the World's Capital Ships. New York: Hippocrene Books. ISBN 0-88254-979-0.
