= 4th Cruiser Squadron =

- Active: 1907–1914, 1919-1946
- Country: United Kingdom
- Branch: Royal Navy
- Garrison/HQ: Halifax, Nova Scotia (1907-1915)

Commanders
- Notable commanders: Rear-Admiral Frederick S. Inglefield

The 4th Cruiser Squadron and (also known as Cruiser Force H) was a formation of cruisers of the British Royal Navy from 1907 to 1914 and then again from 1919 to 1946.

The squadron was first established in 1907, replacing the Royal Naval Dockyard, Bermuda-based squadron of the North America and West Indies Station. It became a training squadron based in Home waters but which was to make three cruises annually, including to the West Indies. In April 1907 it comprised Euryalus, Hogue, and Sutlej.

On 1 May 1912, the Fourth Cruiser Squadron was renamed the Training Squadron. With the appointment in 1913 of Rear Admiral Christopher Cradock the squadron ceased to be a training squadron and became part of the First Fleet. During World War I, the 4th Cruiser Squadron was commanded by Rear Admiral Christopher Cradock; the squadron was effectively annihilated at the Battle of Coronel 1 November 1914. Following Britain's entry into the First World War, the Imperial fortress colony of Bermuda was restored as the main base for the squadron on the North America and West Indies Station (after the war, the 8th Light Cruiser Squadron).

From April 1919 to 1939, it was in the East Indies, and comprised HMS Highflyer, HMS Caroline, HMS Comus, HMS Southampton (Flagship) until July 1925; HMS Colombo (January 1922-January 1926; June 1932-February 1936); HMS Cairo (June 1922-December 1926); and HMS Chatham (October 1924-January 1926) assigned from the Navy's old light cruisers; HMS Effingham (Flag) (July 1925 – 1933); HMS Emerald (1935-August 1938); HMS Enterprise (January 1926 – 1935; February 1936 – 1939); and HMS Hawkins (1933-March 1935) from the E-Class cruisers and Frobishers; plus from the newer cruiser HMS Norfolk, and the Town-class cruisers HMS Manchester, Liverpool, and Gloucester.

== Ships on 1 November 1914 ==
Name	Type	Guns	Speed	Displacement	Crew
HMS Good Hope	Armored cruiser	2 × 9.2 in (230 mm) guns 16 × 6 in (150 mm) guns	23 knots (43 km/h; 26 mph)	14,100 t (13,900 long tons; 15,500 short tons)	900
HMS Monmouth	Armored cruiser	14 × 6 in guns	23 knots (43 km/h; 26 mph)	9,800 t (9,600 long tons; 10,800 short tons)	690
HMS Glasgow	Light cruiser	2 × 6 in guns 16 × 4 in (100 mm) guns	25 knots (46 km/h; 29 mph)	5,300 t (5,200 long tons; 5,800 short tons)	411
HMS Otranto	Armed merchantman	4 × 4.7 in (120 mm) guns	18 knots (33 km/h; 21 mph)	12,124 t (11,933 long tons; 13,364 short tons)	350
