= HMS Good Hope (1901) =

Drake-class armored cruiser

Coordinates: 36°59′1″S 73°48′49″W

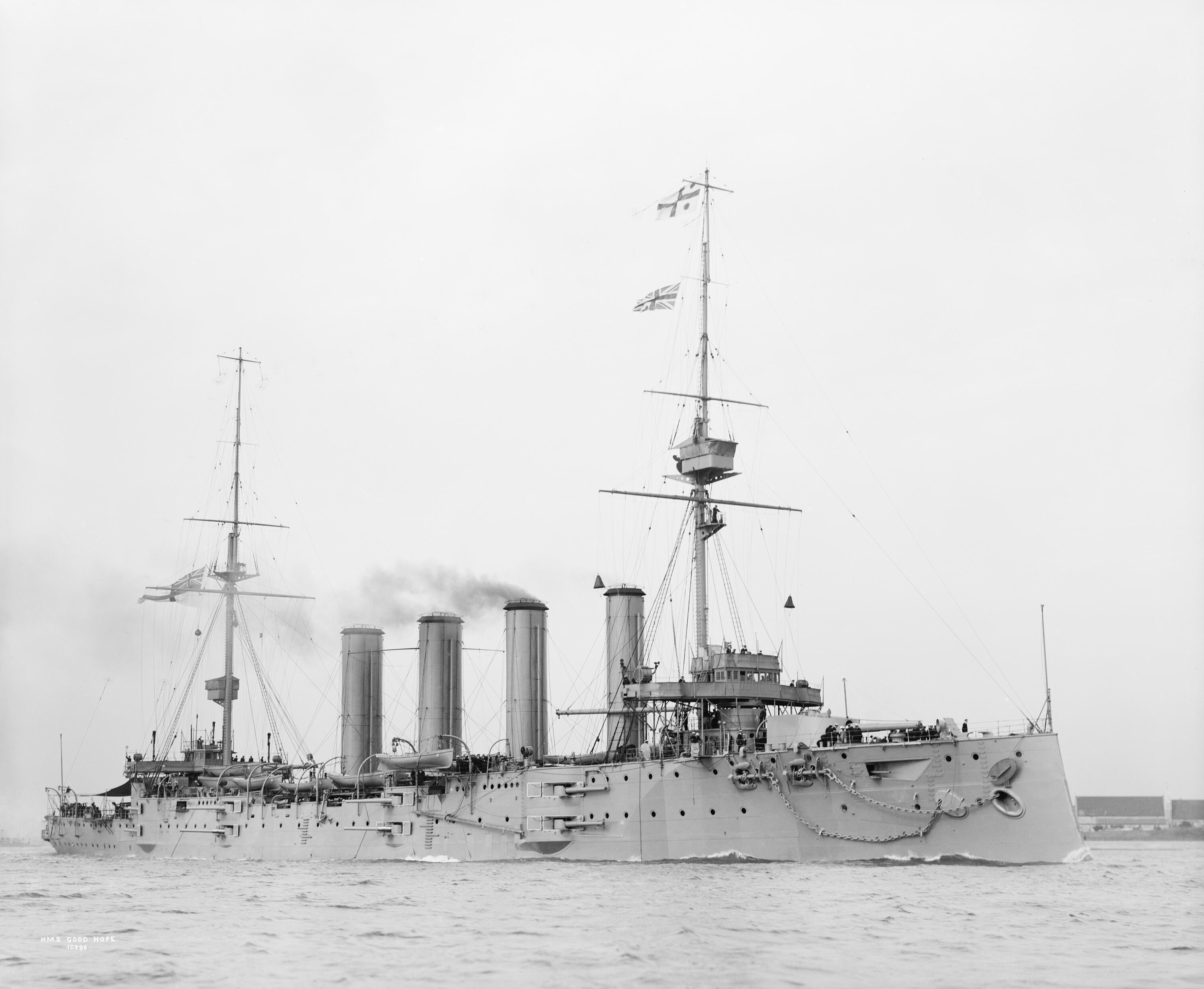
- Good Hope before 1914

History

United Kingdom
- Name: Good Hope
- Namesake: Cape Colony
- Builder: Fairfield Shipbuilding & Engineering, Govan
- Laid down: 11 September 1899
- Launched: 21 February 1901
- Christened: Ethel Elgar
- Completed: 8 November 1902
- Fate: Sunk at the Battle of Coronel, 1 November 1914

General characteristics
- Class & type: Drake-class armoured cruiser
- Displacement: 14,150 long tons (14,380 t) (normal)
- Length: 533 ft 6 in (162.6 m) (o/a)
- Beam: 71 ft 4 in (21.7 m)
- Draught: 26 ft (7.9 m)
- Installed power: 30,000 ihp (22,000 kW); 43 × Belleville boilers
- Propulsion: 2 × shafts; 2 × triple-expansion steam engines
- Speed: 23 knots (43 km/h; 26 mph)
- Complement: 900
- Armament: 2 × single 9.2 in (234 mm) guns; 16 × single 6 in (152 mm) guns; 12 × single 12-pdr (3 in (76 mm) 12-cwt guns (Note: "Cwt" is the abbreviation for hundredweight, 12 cwt referring to the weight of the gun.); 3 × 3-pdr (47 mm (1.9 in)) guns; 2 × single 18 in (450 mm) torpedo tubes
- Armour: Belt: 2–6 in (51–152 mm); Decks: 1–2.5 in (25–64 mm); Barbettes: 6 in (152 mm); Turrets: 6 in (150 mm); Conning tower: 12 in (305 mm); Bulkheads: 5 in (127 mm)

HMS Good Hope was one of four Drake-class armoured cruisers built for the Royal Navy around 1900; she was originally named Africa, but was renamed before she was launched. She became flagship of the 1st Cruiser Squadron of the Atlantic Fleet in 1906, and was the flagship of the 2nd Cruiser Squadron in 1908. She was reduced to reserve in 1913, but was recommissioned in mid-1914.

When war was declared in August 1914, Good Hope was ordered to reinforce the 4th Cruiser Squadron and became the flagship of Rear Admiral Christopher Cradock. Cradock moved the available ships of his squadron later that month to the coast of South America to search for German commerce raiders.

He was then ordered further south to the Strait of Magellan to block any attempt of the German East Asia Squadron to penetrate into the South Atlantic. He found the German squadron on 1 November off the coast of Chile. The German squadron outnumbered Cradock's force and were individually more powerful; they sank Cradock's two armoured cruisers in the Battle of Coronel, both, including Good Hope, being lost with all hands.

== Design and description ==
Good Hope was designed to displace 14,150 long tons (14,380 t). The ship had an overall length of 553 feet 6 inches (168.7 m), a beam of 71 feet 4 inches (21.7 m) and a deep draught of 26 feet 9 inches (8.2 m). She was powered by two 4-cylinder triple-expansion steam engines, each driving one shaft, which produced a total of 30,000 indicated horsepower (22,000 kW) and gave a maximum speed of 23 knots (43 km/h; 26 mph). The engines were powered by 43 Belleville boilers. She carried a maximum of 2,500 long tons (2,500 t) of coal and her complement consisted of 900 officers and ratings.

Her main armament consisted of two breech-loading (BL) 9.2-inch (234 mm) Mk X guns in single gun turrets, one each fore and aft of the superstructure. Her secondary armament of sixteen BL 6-inch Mk VII guns was arranged in casemates amidships. Eight of these were mounted on the main deck and were only usable in calm weather. A dozen quick-firing (QF) 12-pounder 12 cwt guns were fitted for defence against torpedo boats. Two additional 12-pounder 8 cwt guns could be dismounted for service ashore. Good Hope also carried three 3-pounder Hotchkiss guns and two submerged 17.72-inch (450 mm) torpedo tubes.

The ship's waterline armour belt had a maximum thickness of 6 inches (152 mm) and was closed off by 5-inch (127 mm) transverse bulkheads. The armour of the gun turrets and their barbettes was 6 inches thick while the casemate armour was 5 inches thick. The protective deck armour ranged in thickness from 1–2.5 inches (25–64 mm) and the conning tower was protected by 12 inches (305 mm) of armour.

== Service ==
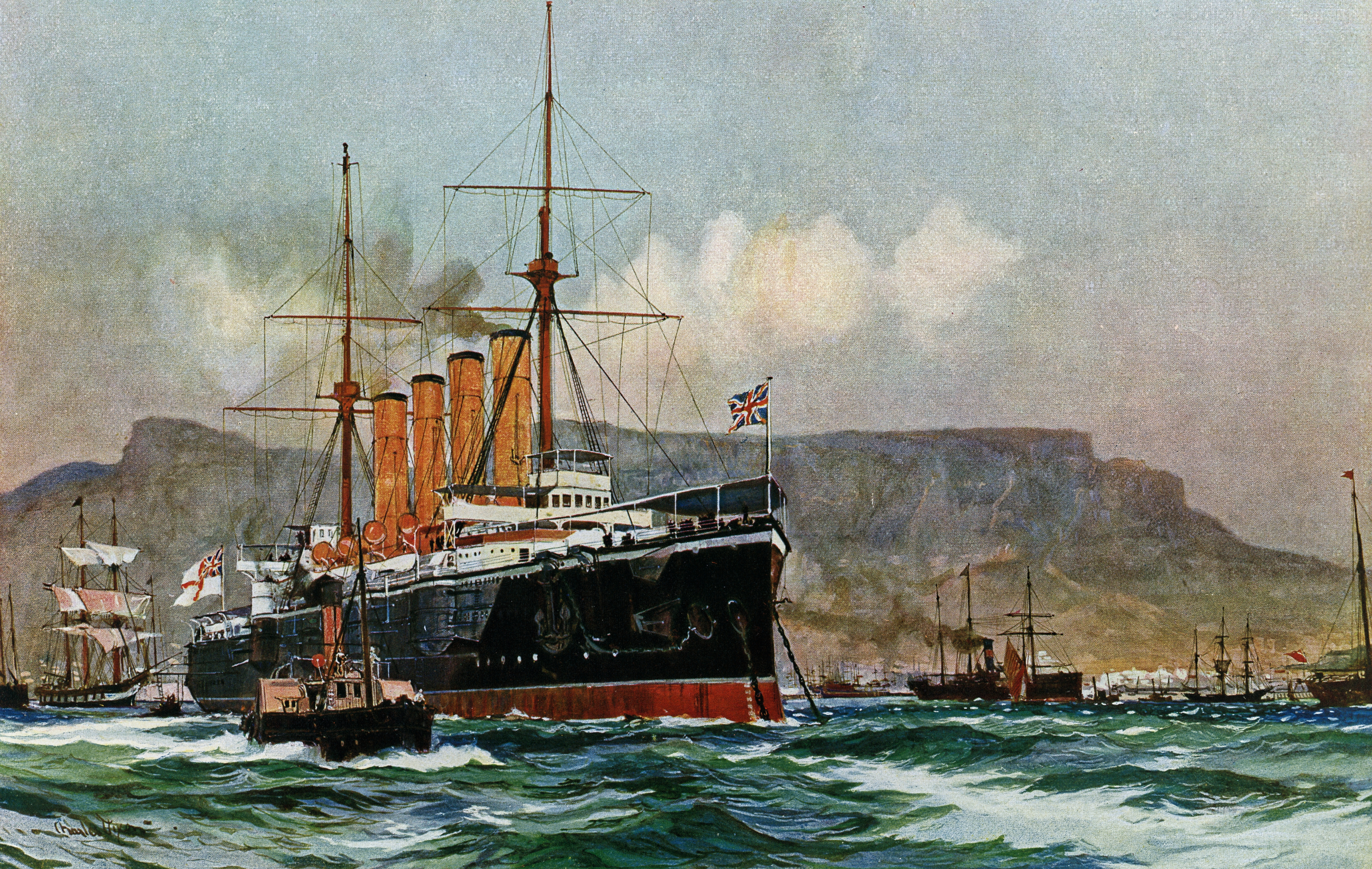
Good Hope in Table Bay, by Charles Dixon

Good Hope, named after the British colony on the Cape of Good Hope, was laid down on 11 September 1899 with the name of Africa by Fairfield Shipbuilding & Engineering at their Govan shipyard. She was renamed Good Hope on 2 October and launched on 21 February 1901, when she was formally named by Mrs. (Ethel) Elgar, wife of Francis Elgar, manager of the shipbuilding company. She arrived in Portsmouth to be completed and armed in late December 1901. Captain Charles Edward Madden was appointed in command for her first commission on 8 November 1902.

She was to be commissioned as flagship of Rear-Admiral Wilmot Fawkes as he succeeded as commander of the Cruiser Squadron in the Home Fleet, but was ordered first to convey Joseph Chamberlain, Secretary of State for the Colonies, to South Africa in late 1902. Fawkes hoisted his flag on 23 November, and the ship left Portsmouth with Chamberlain and his wife on board two days later. During the outward voyage, the Good Hope docked at Port Said, Suez, Aden, Mombasa, and Zanzibar, before landing Chamberlain at Durban in late December. After staying through Christmas at Port Elizabeth, she visited Simon's Town before returning home along the West Coast of Africa. Leaving Cape Town on 22 January 1903, she docked at several places including São Vicente, Cape Verde and Las Palmas, and returned in February, then joined her sister ship HMS Drake cruising with the Mediterranean squadron until May 1903. In 1906 she became the flagship of the 1st Cruiser Squadron, Atlantic Fleet and was the flagship of the 2nd Cruiser Squadron when she visited South Africa two years later. Good Hope was placed in reserve in 1913.

Good Hope was re-commissioned in mid-1914 with a crew composed mainly of naval reservists and was briefly assigned to the 6th Cruiser Squadron in August, before being transferring the 4th Cruiser Squadron. She rendezvoused at the old Royal Naval Dockyard (which had closed in 1905 and transferred to the Dominion government to become Her Majesty's Canadian Dockyard) in the former Imperial fortress of Halifax, Nova Scotia (which had replaced the Bermuda-based squadron of the North America and West Indies Station in 1907), with HMS Suffolk, the flagship of Rear-Admiral Sir Christopher Cradock. Cradock transferred his flag to Good Hope because she was faster than his previous flagship. In Halifax, the crew of Good Hope was joined by four young Canadian midshipmen to assist Cradock with his command. They would become the first Royal Canadian Navy casualties of the First World War.

Cradock's command was despatched to the coast of South America later that month at his own suggestion to better hunt for the German ships preying upon British merchant ships. Good Hope was coaled at the Royal Naval Dockyard in the North Atlantic Imperial fortress colony of Bermuda (by Bermuda Militia Artillery gunners assisting with coaling). On the way south, Good Hope's crew was strengthened by the recruitment of 26 stokers in the West Indies, probably in St. Lucia. His ships were generally unsuccessful in this and he moved his squadron further south in late September to search for the East Asia Squadron, under the command of Vice Admiral Graf Maximilian von Spee, in the vicinity of Cape Horn and the Strait of Magellan in accordance to his orders from the Admiralty.

At the end of September, Cradock made his first fruitless search of the Tierra del Fuego area and later detached three of his ships to search up the Chilean coast, reaching Valparaíso on 15 October, while Good Hope returned to Port Stanley, in the Falkland Islands, to recoal and to reestablish communications with the Admiralty. He received word on 7 October that Spee's ships were definitely bound for the Cape Horn region and waited for the elderly predreadnought battleship Canopus to reinforce his squadron. She was in poor mechanical condition when she arrived at Port Stanley and required time to make repairs. Good Hope sailed on 22 October without her, going around Cape Horn, while Canopus and three colliers departed the following day, taking the shorter route through the Strait of Magellan.

=== Battle of Coronel ===
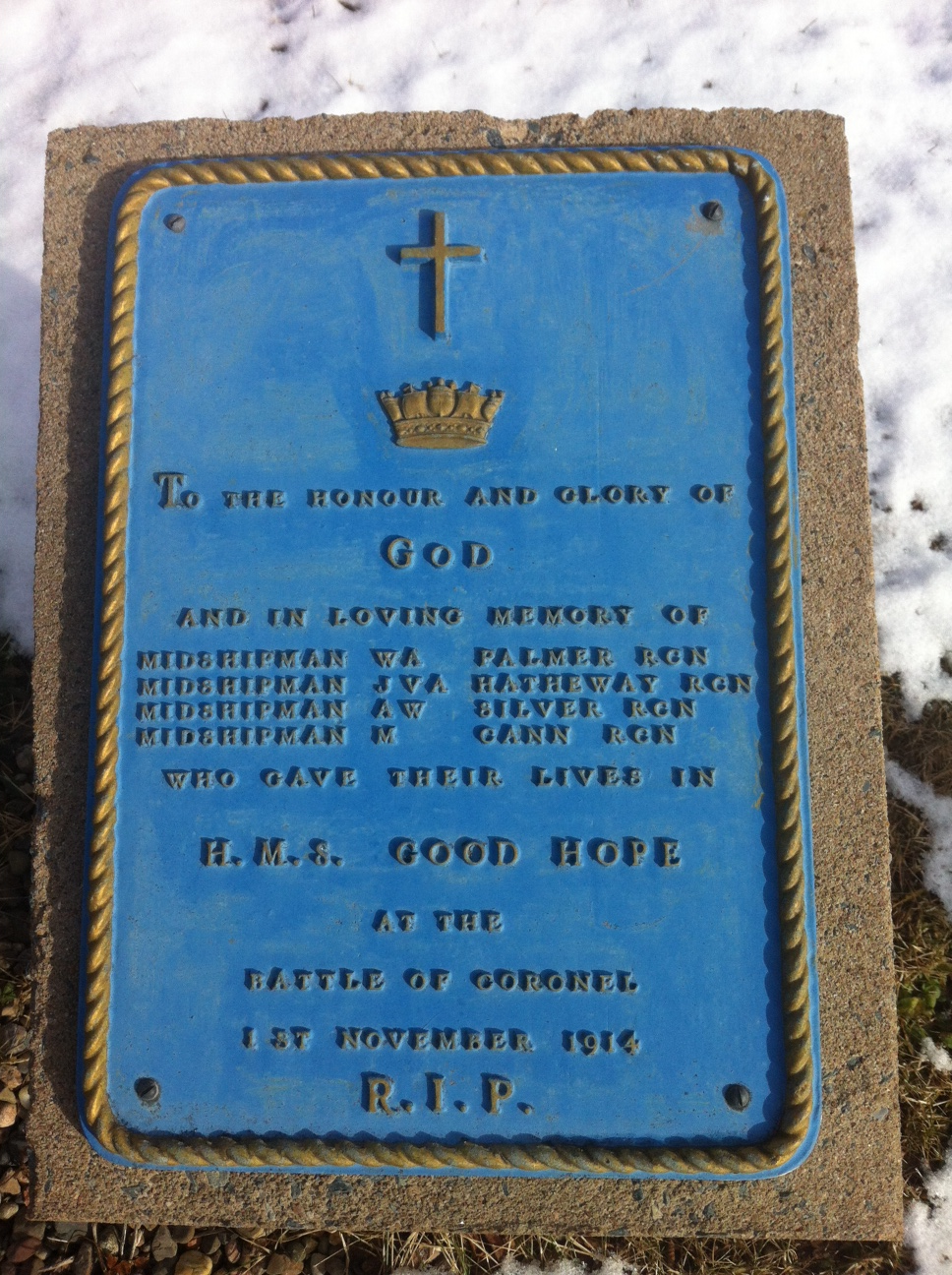
HMS Good Hope plaque, CFB Halifax

Good Hope rendezvoused with the rest of the squadron at Vallenar Roads in the remote Chonos Archipelago of Chile on 27 October to recoal. They departed two days later, just as Canopus arrived, Cradock ordering the battleship to follow as soon as possible. He sent the light cruiser Glasgow to scout ahead and to enter Coronel, Chile, to pick up any messages from the Admiralty and acquire intelligence regarding German activities. The cruiser began to pick up German radio signals from the light cruiser SMS Leipzig on the afternoon of 29 October, and delayed entering Coronel for two days with Cradock's permission to avoid being trapped by the fast German ships. A German supply ship was already there and radioed Spee that Glasgow had entered the harbour around twilight. The cruiser departed on the morning of 1 November, but Spee had already made plans to catch her when informed of her presence the previous evening.

Glasgow departed Coronel at 09:15 after having picked up the squadron's mail and rendezvoused with the rest of the squadron four hours later. Cradock ordered his ships to form line abreast with an interval of 15 nautical miles (28 km; 17 mi) between ships to maximise visibility at 13:50, and steered north at a speed of 10 knots (19 km/h; 12 mph). At 16:17 Leipzig spotted Glasgow, the easternmost British ship, to its west and she spotted Leipzig's funnel smoke three minutes later. At 17:10 Cradock ordered his ships to head for Glasgow, the closest ship to the Germans. Once gathered together, he formed them into line astern, with Good Hope in the lead, steering southeasterly at 16 knots (30 km/h; 18 mph) at 18:18. As the sixteen 21-centimetre (8.3 in) guns aboard the armoured cruisers Scharnhorst and Gneisenau were only matched by the two 9.2-inch guns on his flagship, he needed to close the range to bring his more numerous 6-inch guns to bear. The Force 7 winds and high seas, however, prevented the use of half of those guns as they were too close to the water. He also wanted to use the setting sun to his advantage so that its light would blind the German gunners. Spee was well aware of the British advantages and refused to allow Cradock to close the range. His ships were faster than the British, slowed by the 16-knot maximum speed of the armed merchant cruiser Otranto, and he opened up the range to 18,000 yards (16,000 m) until conditions changed to suit him. The sun set at 18:50, which silhouetted the British ships against the light sky while the German ships became indistinguishable from the shoreline behind them.

Spee immediately turned to close and signalled his ships to open fire at 19:04 when the range closed to 12,300 yards (11,200 m). Spee's flagship, Scharnhorst, engaged Good Hope while Gneisenau fired at Monmouth. Cradock's flagship was hit on the Scharnhorst's third salvo, when shells knocked out her forward 9.2-inch turret and set her forecastle on fire. Cradock, knowing his only chance was to close the range, continued to do so despite the battering that Spee's ships inflicted. By 19:23 the range was almost half of that when the battle began and the British ships bore onwards. Spee tried to open the range, fearing a torpedo attack, but the British were only 5,500 yards (5,000 m) away at 19:35. Seven minutes later, Good Hope charged directly at the German ships, although they dodged out of her way. Spee ordered his armoured cruisers to concentrate their fire on the British flagship and she soon drifted to a halt with her topsides all aflame. At 19:50 her forward magazine exploded, severing the bow from the rest of the ship, and she later sank in the darkness. Spee estimated that his flagship had made 35 hits on Good Hope, suffering only two hits in return that did no significant damage and failed even to wound one crewman. Good Hope was sunk with all hands, a total of 926 officers and ratings. Four of the midshipmen aboard the ship were the first casualties of the newly formed Royal Canadian Navy.

== Notable commanding officers ==
- Charles Douglas Carpendale, 1911–1912

== Bibliography ==
- Bennet, Geoffrey (2000). Coronel and the Falklands. Birlinn. ISBN 1-84158-045-7.
- Chesneau, Roger & Kolesnik, Eugene M., eds. (1979). Conway's All the World's Fighting Ships 1860–1905. Greenwich: Conway Maritime Press. ISBN 0-8317-0302-4.
- Corbett, Julian (March 1997). Naval Operations to the Battle of the Falklands. History of the Great War: Based on Official Documents. Vol. I (2nd, reprint of the 1938 ed.). London and Nashville, Tennessee: Imperial War Museum and Battery Press. ISBN 0-89839-256-X.
- Friedman, Norman (2012). British Cruisers of the Victorian Era. Barnsley, South Yorkshire, UK: Seaforth. ISBN 978-1-59114-068-9.
- Gardiner, Robert & Gray, Randal, eds. (1985). Conway's All the World's Fighting Ships 1906–1921. Annapolis, Maryland: Naval Institute Press. ISBN 0-85177-245-5.
- Massie, Robert K. (2004). Castles of Steel: Britain, Germany, and the Winning of the Great War at Sea. London: Jonathan Cape. ISBN 0-224-04092-8.
- Sieche, Erwin F. (1990). "Austria-Hungary's Last Visit to the USA". Warship International. XXVII (2): 142–164. ISSN 0043-0374.
- Silverstone, Paul H. (1984). Directory of the World's Capital Ships. New York: Hippocrene Books. ISBN 0-88254-979-0.
