= HMS Monmouth (1901) =

Lead ship of British Monmouth-class

Coordinates: 36°53′53″S 73°50′45″W

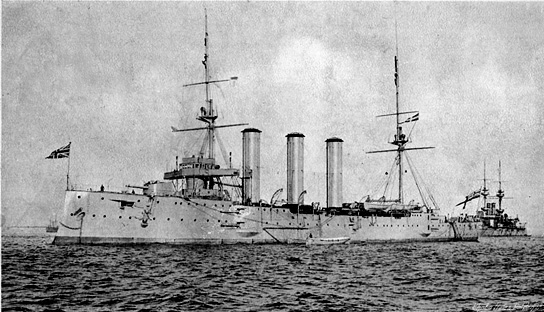
- Monmouth at anchor

History

United Kingdom
- Name: Monmouth
- Namesake: Monmouthshire
- Builder: London & Glasgow Shipbuilding, Govan
- Laid down: 29 August 1899
- Launched: 13 November 1901
- Completed: 2 December 1903
- Fate: Sunk at the Battle of Coronel, 1 November 1914

General characteristics
- Class & type: Monmouth-class armoured cruiser
- Displacement: 9,800 long tons (10,000 t) (normal)
- Length: 463 ft 6 in (141.3 m) (o/a)
- Beam: 66 ft (20.1 m)
- Draught: 25 ft (7.6 m)
- Installed power: 31 water-tube boilers; 22,000 ihp (16,000 kW)
- Propulsion: 2 × shafts; 2 × triple-expansion steam engines
- Speed: 23 knots (43 km/h; 26 mph)
- Complement: 678
- Armament: 2 × twin, 10 × single 6 in (152 mm) guns; 10 × single 12-pdr (3 in (76 mm)) guns; 3 × single 3-pdr (1.9 in (47 mm)) guns; 2 × 18 in (450 mm) torpedo tubes
- Armour: Belt: 2–4 in (51–102 mm); Decks: 0.75–2 in (19–51 mm); Barbettes: 4 in (102 mm); Turrets: 4 in (102 mm); Conning tower: 10 in (254 mm)

HMS Monmouth was the name ship of her class of 10 armoured cruisers built for the Royal Navy in the first decade of the 20th century. The ships were also known as the County Cruisers (each being named after a British county).

She was assigned to the 1st Cruiser Squadron of the Channel Fleet upon completion in 1903. She was transferred to the China Station in 1906, and remained there until she returned home in 1913 and was assigned to the reserve Third Fleet. When World War I began in August 1914, the ship was recommissioned and assigned to the 5th Cruiser Squadron in the Central Atlantic to search for German commerce raiders and protect Allied shipping. She was detached upon arrival to patrol the Brazilian coast for German ships, and was later ordered to the South Atlantic to join Rear Admiral Christopher Cradock's squadron in their search for the German East Asia Squadron. He found the German squadron on 1 November off the coast of Chile. The German squadron outnumbered Cradock's force and were individually more powerful; they sank Cradock's two armoured cruisers in the Battle of Coronel. Monmouth was lost with all hands.

== Design and description ==
The Monmouths were intended to protect British merchant shipping from fast cruisers like the French Guichen, Châteaurenault or the Dupleix classes. The ships were designed to displace 9,800 long tons (10,000 t). They had an overall length of 463 feet 6 inches (141.3 m), a beam of 66 feet (20.1 m) and a deep draught of 25 feet (7.6 m). They were powered by two 4-cylinder triple-expansion steam engines, each driving one shaft using steam provided by 31 Belleville boilers. The engines produced a total of 22,000 indicated horsepower (16,000 kW) which was designed to give the ships a maximum speed of 23 knots (43 km/h; 26 mph). Monmouth, however, was one of three of the ships of the class that failed to meet their designed speed. She carried a maximum of 1,600 long tons (1,600 t) of coal and her complement consisted of 678 officers and ratings.

The Monmouth-class ships' main armament consisted of fourteen breech-loading (BL) 6-inch (152 mm) Mk VII guns. Four of these guns were mounted in two twin-gun turrets, one each fore and aft of the superstructure, and the others were positioned in casemates amidships. Six of these were mounted on the main deck and were only usable in calm weather. Ten quick-firing (QF) 12-pounder (3-inch (76 mm)) 12-cwt guns (Note: "Cwt" is the abbreviation for hundredweight, 12 cwt referring to the weight of the gun.) were fitted for defence against torpedo boats. Monmouth also carried three 3-pounder 1.9 in (47 mm) Hotchkiss guns and two submerged 18-inch (450 mm) torpedo tubes.

The ship's waterline armour belt was four inches (102 mm) thick amidships and two-inch (51 mm) forward. The armour of the gun turrets, their barbettes and the casemates was four inches thick. The protective deck armour ranged in thickness from 0.75–2 inches (19–51 mm) and the conning tower was protected by ten inches (254 mm) of armour.

== Construction and career ==
Monmouth c. 1902, while still fitting out

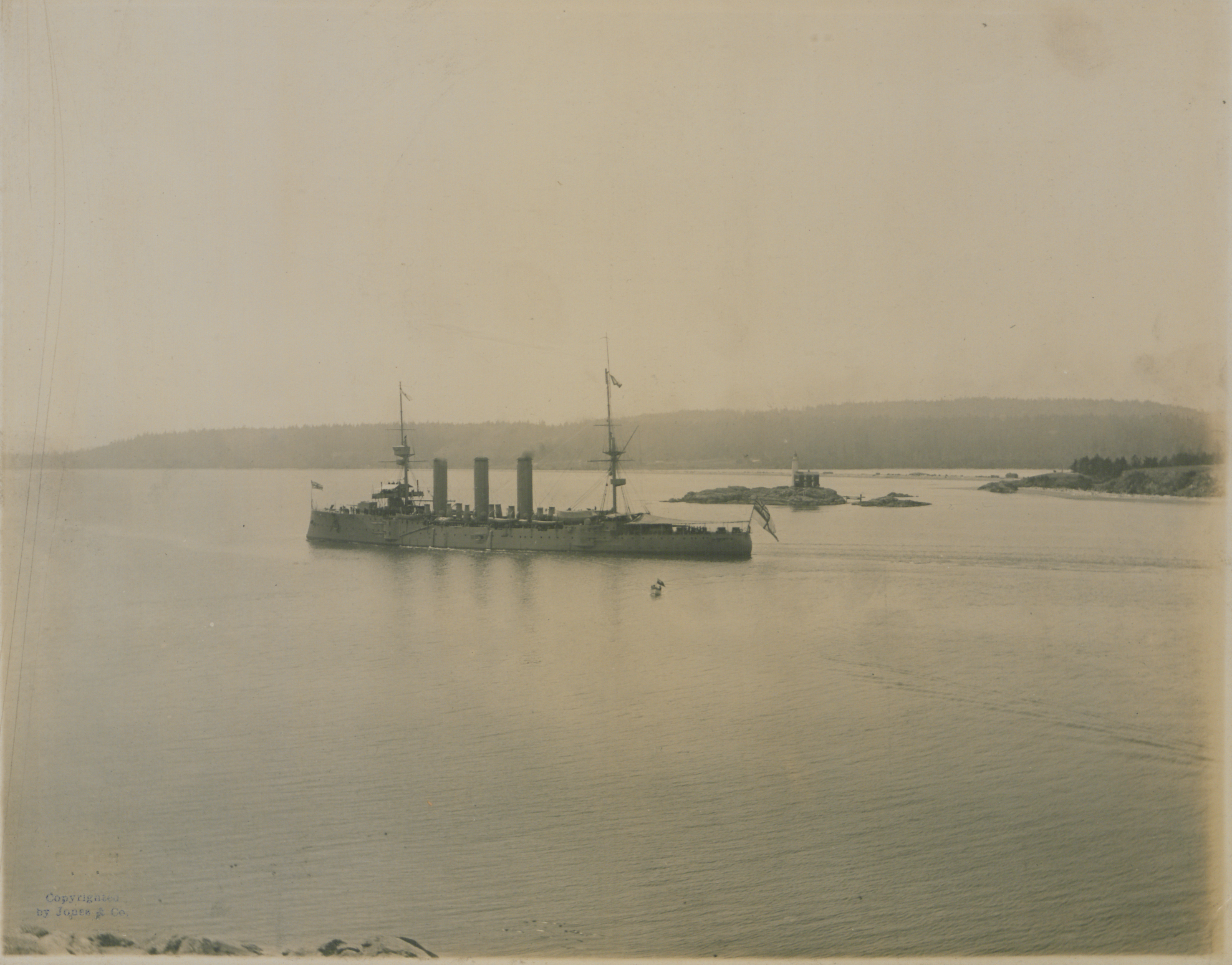
Monmouth leaving Esquimalt Harbour with Prince Fushimi, 1907

Monmouth, named for the Welsh county, was laid down by London and Glasgow Shipbuilding at their shipyard in Govan on 29 August 1899, and launched on 13 November 1901. Her completion was delayed due to a collision with the liner Assyria in Glasgow harbour in late March 1902. She arrived at Devonport in late August that year for trials, but was not finally completed and accepted until 2 December 1903, when she was initially assigned to the 1st Cruiser Squadron of the Channel Fleet. She was briefly placed in reserve in Devonport at the end of January 1906, before being recommissioned in April for service on the China Station. During 1913 Monmouth paid a courtesy visit to the German treaty port of Tsingtao in China. Later in the same year she returned home and was assigned to the reserve Third Fleet.

She was mobilised on 4 August 1914 with a crew of 738 personnel consisting of 570 ratings and 29 officers in addition to 25 members of the Royal Marine band and 69 Royal Marines. In many sources, it is stated her crew mostly consisted of reservists; however, according to a ship's crew list, only 8 crew members were part of the Royal Naval Reserve in addition to 26 members of the Coast Guard. Post mobilisation, she was sent to the 5th Cruiser Squadron of Rear Admiral Archibald Stoddart on the Cape Verde – Canary Islands station. Upon her arrival on 13 August, Stoddart detached her to the Brazilian coast to search for the German light cruisers known to be in the area. She came under Cradock's command in mid-September. At the end of September, Cradock made his first fruitless search of the Tierra del Fuego area and later detached Monmouth and two other ships to search up the Chilean coast, reaching Valparaíso on 15 October, while his flagship, Good Hope returned to Port Stanley, in the Falkland Islands, to recoal and to reestablish communications with the Admiralty. He received word on 7 October that German Vice Admiral Spee's ships were definitely bound for the Cape Horn region and waited for the elderly predreadnought battleship Canopus to reinforce his squadron. She was in poor mechanical condition when she arrived at Port Stanley and required time to make repairs. Good Hope sailed on 22 October without her, going around Cape Horn, while Canopus and three colliers departed the following day, taking the shorter route through the Strait of Magellan.

=== Battle of Coronel ===
Good Hope rendezvoused with the rest of the squadron at Vallenar Roads, in the remote Chonos Archipelago of Chile on 27 October 1914 to recoal. They departed two days later, just as Canopus arrived, Cradock ordering the battleship to follow as soon as possible. He sent the light cruiser Glasgow to scout ahead and to enter Coronel, Chile to pick up any messages from the Admiralty and acquire intelligence regarding German activities. The cruiser began to pick up German radio signals from the light cruiser SMS Leipzig on the afternoon of 29 October, and delayed entering Coronel for two days with Cradock's permission to avoid being trapped by the fast German ships. A German supply ship was already there and radioed Spee that Glasgow had entered the harbour around twilight. The cruiser departed on the morning of 1 November, but Spee had already made plans to catch her when informed of her presence the previous evening.

Glasgow departed Coronel at 09:15 after having picked up the squadron's mail, and rendezvoused with the rest of the squadron four hours later. Cradock ordered his ships to form line abreast with a distance of 15 nautical miles (28 km; 17 mi) between ships to maximise visibility at 13:50 and steered north at a speed of 10 knots (19 km/h; 12 mph). At 16:17 Leipzig spotted Glasgow, the easternmost British ship, to its west and she spotted Leipzig's funnel smoke three minutes later. At 17:10 Cradock ordered his ships to head for Glasgow, the closest ship to the Germans. Once gathered together, he formed them into line astern, with Good Hope in the lead, steering southeasterly at 16 knots (30 km/h; 18 mph) at 18:18. As the sixteen 21-centimetre (8.3 in) guns aboard the armoured cruisers Scharnhorst and Gneisenau were only matched by the two 9.2-inch guns on his flagship, he needed to close the range to bring his more numerous 6-inch guns to bear. The Force 7 winds and high seas, however, prevented the use of half of those guns as they were too close to the water. He also wanted to use the setting sun to his advantage so that its light would blind the German gunners. Spee was well aware of the British advantages and refused to allow Cradock to close the range. His ships were faster than the British, slowed by the 16-knot maximum speed of the armed merchant cruiser Otranto, and he opened up the range to 18,000 yards (16,000 m) until conditions changed to suit him. The sun set at 18:50, which silhouetted the British ships against the light sky while the German ships became indistinguishable from the shoreline behind them.

Spee immediately turned to close and signalled his ships to open fire at 19:04, when the range closed to 12,300 yards (11,200 m). Spee's flagship, Scharnhorst, engaged Good Hope while Gneisenau fired at Monmouth. The German shooting was very accurate, with both armoured cruisers quickly scoring hits on their British counterparts while still outside six-inch gun range, starting fires on both ships. Cradock, knowing his only chance was to close the range, continued to do so despite the battering that Spee's ships inflicted. By 19:23 the range was almost half of that when the battle began and the British ships bore onwards. One shell from Gneisenau blew the roof off Monmouth's forward turret and started a fire, causing an ammunition explosion that completely blew the turret off the ship. Spee tried to open the range, fearing a torpedo attack, but the British were only 5,500 yards (5,000 m) away at 19:35. Severely damaged, Monmouth began to slow and veered out of line.

Glasgow fought almost an entirely separate battle as the German armoured cruisers ignored her almost completely and she inconclusively dueled the light cruisers Leipzig and Dresden. Glasgow broke contact with the German squadron at 20:05 and discovered Monmouth, listing and down by the bow, having extinguished her fires, 10 minutes later. She was trying to turn north to put her stern to the heavy northerly swell and was taking water at the bow. There was little that Glasgow could do to assist the larger ship as the moonlight illuminated both ships and the Germans were searching for them.

The light cruiser Nürnberg had been trailing the German squadron and spotted the plume of smoke from Glasgow at 20:35, and then saw Monmouth with a 10-degree list to port shortly afterwards. As Nürnberg closed the range, Monmouth's list increased so that none of the guns on her port side could be used. The German cruiser closed to within 600 yards (550 m) and illuminated her flag with its spotlight in the hopes that she would strike her colours and surrender. There was no response from the British ship and Nürnberg opened fire at 21:20, aiming high, but there was still no response. The German ship then fired a torpedo which missed and turned off its searchlight. Monmouth then increased speed and turned towards Nürnberg, which caused her to open fire again. Monmouth capsized at 21:58, taking her entire crew of 734 men with her as the seas were too rough to attempt any rescue effort.

== Bibliography ==
- Bennet, Geoffrey (2000). Coronel and the Falklands. Edinburgh: Birlinn. ISBN 1-84158-045-7.
- Corbett, Julian (1997) [1938]. Naval Operations to the Battle of the Falklands. History of the Great War: Based on Official Documents. Vol. I (2nd ed.). London and Nashville, Tennessee: Imperial War Museum and Battery Press. ISBN 0-89839-256-X.
- Dixon, John (2008). A Clash of Empires (1st ed.). Wrexham, Wales: Bridge Books. ISBN 978-1-84494-052-3.
- Friedman, Norman (2012). British Cruisers of the Victorian Era. Barnsley, UK: Seaforth. ISBN 978-1-59114-068-9.
- Friedman, Norman (2011). Naval Weapons of World War One. Barnsley, UK: Seaforth. ISBN 978-1-84832-100-7.
- Massie, Robert K. (2003). Castles of Steel: Britain, Germany, and the Winning of the Great War at Sea. New York: Random House. ISBN 0-679-45671-6.
- McBride, Keith (1988). "The First County Class Cruisers of the Royal Navy, Part I: The Monmouths". Warship. 46 (April). London: Conway Maritime Press: 19–26. ISSN 0142-6222.
- Preston, Antony (1985). "Great Britain and Empire Forces". In Gray, Randal (ed.). Conway's All the World's Fighting Ships 1906–1921. Annapolis, Maryland: Naval Institute Press. pp. 1–104. ISBN 0-85177-245-5.
- Roberts, John (1979). "Great Britain and Empire Forces". In Chesneau, Roger & Kolesnik, Eugene M. (eds.). Conway's All the World's Fighting Ships 1860-1905. Greenwich, UK: Conway Maritime Press. pp. 1–113. ISBN 0-8317-0302-4.
- Silverstone, Paul H. (1984). Directory of the World's Capital Ships. New York: Hippocrene Books. ISBN 0-88254-979-0.
