= HMS Drake (1901) =

British lead ship of Drake-class

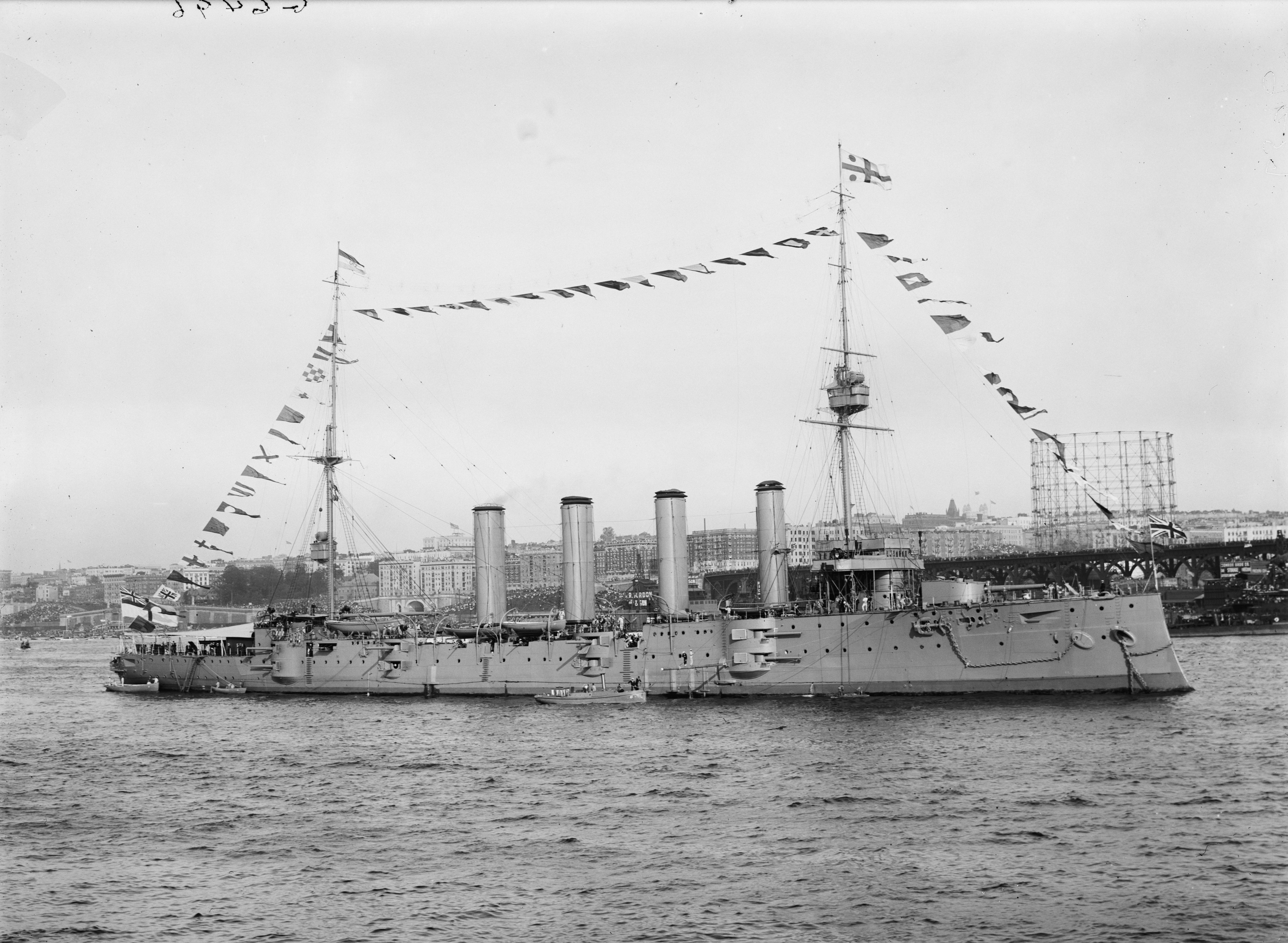
- Drake at anchor in New York Harbor in 1909

History

United Kingdom
- Name: HMS Drake
- Namesake: Sir Francis Drake
- Builder: Pembroke Dock
- Cost: approx. £800 000
- Laid down: 24 April 1899
- Launched: 5 March 1901
- Christened: Mrs. Lort Phillips
- Completed: 9 January 1903
- Commissioned: 13 January 1903
- Fate: Sunk, 2 October 1917

General characteristics
- Class & type: Drake-class armoured cruiser
- Displacement: 14,150 long tons (14,380 t) (normal)
- Length: 533 ft 6 in (162.6 m) (o/a)
- Beam: 71 ft 4 in (21.7 m)
- Draught: 26 ft (7.9 m)
- Installed power: 30,000 ihp (22,000 kW); 43 Belleville boilers
- Propulsion: 2 × shafts; 2 × 4-cylinder triple-expansion steam engines
- Speed: 23 knots (43 km/h; 26 mph)
- Complement: 900
- Armament: 2 × single BL 9.2-inch (234 mm) Mk X guns; 16 × single BL 6-inch (152 mm) Mk VII guns; 12 × single QF 12-pounder (76 mm) guns (Note: "Cwt" is the abbreviation for hundredweight, 12 cwt referring to the weight of the gun.); 3 × QF 3-pounder (47 mm) Hotchkiss guns; 2 × single 18-inch (450 mm) torpedo tubes
- Armour: Belt: 2–6 in (51–152 mm); Decks: 1–2.5 in (25–64 mm); Barbettes: 6 in (152 mm); Turrets: 6 in (150 mm); Conning tower: 12 in (305 mm); Bulkheads: 5 in (127 mm)

HMS Drake was the lead ship of her class of armoured cruisers built for the Royal Navy around 1900. She was assigned to several different cruiser squadrons in home waters upon completion, sometimes as flagship, until 1911 when she became the flagship of the Australia Station. Upon her return home, she was assigned to the 6th Cruiser Squadron of the 2nd Fleet and became the squadron's flagship when the fleet was incorporated into the Grand Fleet upon the outbreak of the First World War.

She remained with the Grand Fleet until refitted in late 1915, when she was transferred to the North America and West Indies Station for convoy escort duties. In 1916 she participated in the unsuccessful search for the German commerce raider SMS Möwe. In late 1917 Drake was torpedoed by a German submarine off Northern Ireland and sank in shallow water with the loss of eighteen lives near Rathlin Island. The wreck was partly salvaged, beginning in 1920; a fishing trawler collided with the remainder of the wreck in 1962 and sank the next day. The wrecks of the two ships were demolished during the 1970s, but their remnants remain a popular dive site. Since June 2017, Drake's wreck has been a scheduled historic monument.

== Design and description ==
The Drake-class ships were designed as faster and larger versions of the preceding Cressy class with a slightly more powerful armament. They displaced 14,100 long tons (14,300 t), over 2,100 long tons (2,134 t) more than the earlier ships. The Drakes had an overall length of 553 feet 6 inches (168.7 m), a beam of 71 feet 4 inches (21.7 m) and a deep draught of 26 feet 9 inches (8.2 m). They were powered by two 4-cylinder triple-expansion steam engines, each driving one shaft, which produced a total of 30,000 indicated horsepower (22,000 kW) and gave a maximum speed of 23 knots (43 km/h; 26 mph) using steam provided by 43 Belleville boilers. On her sea trials, Drake reached a speed of 24.11 knots (44.65 km/h; 27.75 mph). She carried a maximum of 2,500 long tons (2,500 t) of coal and her complement consisted of 900 officers and ratings.

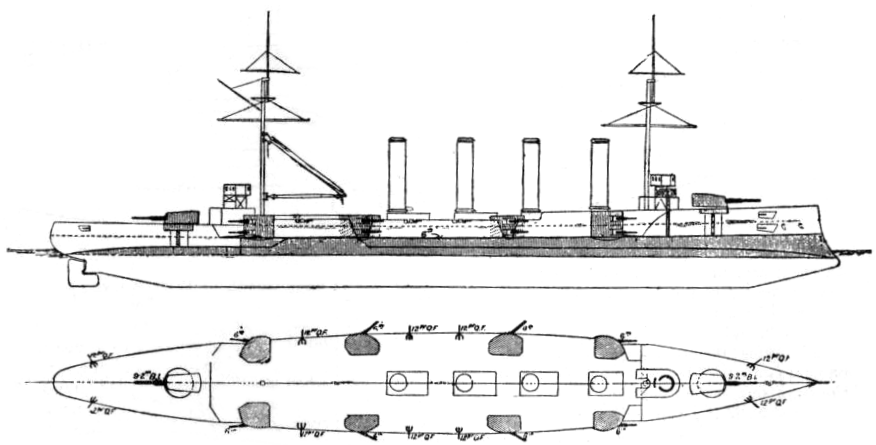
Arrangement of guns and armour of HMS Drake

The main armament of the Drake class consisted of two breech-loading (BL) 9.2-inch (234 mm) Mk X guns in single turrets, one each fore and aft of the superstructure. Her secondary armament of sixteen BL 6-inch (152 mm) Mk VII guns was arranged in casemates amidships. Eight of these were mounted on the lower deck and were only usable in calm weather. A dozen quick-firing (QF) 12-pounder (76 mm) 12-cwt guns were fitted for defence against torpedo boats. Two additional 12-pounder 8-cwt guns could be dismounted for service ashore. The ships also carried three 3-pounder (47 mm) Hotchkiss guns and two submerged 18-inch (450 mm) torpedo tubes.

By February 1916, all of the lower casemates for her six-inch guns had been plated over and six of them had been remounted on the upper deck so they could be used in heavy weather. Several twelve-pounders had to be removed to make room for the six-inch guns.

The ship's waterline armour belt had a maximum thickness of 6 inches and was closed off by 5-inch (127 mm) transverse bulkheads. The armour of the gun turrets and their barbettes was 6 inches thick while that of the casemates was 5 inches thick. The protective deck armour ranged in thickness from 1–2.5 inches (25–64 mm) and the conning tower was protected by 12 inches (305 mm) of armour.

== Construction and service ==
HMS Drake, named after the Elizabethan adventurer Sir Francis Drake, was laid down at Pembroke Dock on 24 April 1899, and launched on 5 March 1901, when she was christened by Mrs. Lort Phillips, wife of local landowner F. Lort Phillips, of Lawrenny. Based at Portsmouth for her gun, torpedo and circle trials in late 1902, there was also trials with a new type of propeller. She was completed and temporarily assigned to the Fleet reserve on 9 January 1903, and commissioned to the Cruiser Squadron of the Channel Fleet on 13 January 1903, under the command of the future First Sea Lord, Captain Francis Bridgeman. From January to May 1903 she cruised with the Mediterranean squadron together with her sister ship Good Hope, visiting among other places Vilagarcía, Funchal and the Canary Islands.

John Jellicoe, also a future First Sea Lord and commander of the Grand Fleet, was her next captain in 1903–1904. Between 1905 and 1907 Drake was the flagship of the 2nd Cruiser Squadron; Admiral Prince Louis of Battenberg in command. During Battenberg's tenure the squadron visited Greece, Portugal, Canada, and the United States, where the American press commented favourably on Prince Louis's courtesy, unassuming manner and democratic nature. In 1907 the ship was commanded by Captain Arthur Hayes-Sadler and serving as the flagship of the 2nd Cruiser Squadron under the command of Rear Admiral Charles Henry Adair. The following year, Drake became the flagship of 1st Cruiser Squadron of the Channel Fleet (attending the Hudson–Fulton Celebration during this time) and then was assigned as flagship of the 5th Cruiser Squadron of the Atlantic Fleet in 1909. She was re-commissioned as the flagship of the Australia Station from early 1911 until returning to home waters in 1913. She then went into the 6th Cruiser Squadron, notionally part of the Second Fleet, on 13 March 1913, but actually was in care and maintenance under the control of the Third Fleet.

That fleet was merged into the Grand Fleet upon mobilization in mid-1914 and Drake became flagship of Rear Admiral William Grant, commander of the squadron. The squadron was briefly deployed at the beginning of the war to blockade the northern exit from the North Sea. In October 1914, under the command of Aubrey Smith, the ship was used to carry Russian bullion worth eight million pounds to Britain; on arrival, Drake lay 30 miles (48 km) off Archangel, and the gold was brought to her at night. The ship was refitted in October 1915 and then transferred to the North America and West Indies Station for convoy escort duties. She participated in the unsuccessful search in the West Indies for the German commerce raider SMS Möwe in December 1916.

Drake was torpedoed by the German submarine U-79, commanded by Kapitänleutnant Otto Rohrbeck, on 2 October 1917 after her Convoy HH 24 had dispersed for its several destinations. The ship was about five miles (8.0 km) off Rathlin Island at the tip of Northern Ireland when she was hit. The torpedo struck the No. 2 Boiler Room and caused two of her engine rooms and the boiler room to flood, killing 18 crewmen. These gave her a list and knocked out her steam-powered steering. Her captain decided to steam for Church Bay on Rathlin Island and accidentally collided with the merchant ship SS Mendip Range before she dropped anchor. The collision did not damage Drake much, but Mendip Range was forced to beach herself lest she sink. Drake's crew was taken off before she capsized later that afternoon.

Her wreck at 55°17.1084′N 06°12.5136′W in Church Bay is a favourite site for divers because the wreck is only at a depth between 15–19 metres (49–62 ft) and generally has good visibility. Salvage of the wreck began in 1920 and continued for several years. On the night of 3 November 1962, the steam trawler Ella Hewett struck the wreck and subsequently sank almost atop Drake. Ammunition and ordnance was salvaged during the 1970s and the wrecks were demolished with depth charges to reduce the chance of any other ships coming to grief on the wrecks. In 1978, the remaining fuel oil was salvaged to reduce pollution from leaking oil.

== Bibliography ==
- Aspinwall, John Bridge, ed. (1921). Reports of Cases Relating to Maritime Law; Containing all the Decisions of the Courts of Law and Equity in the United Kingdom. Vol. XIV, New Series: From 1918 to 1920 (Reprint ed.). London: The Field Press.
- Chesneau, Roger & Kolesnik, Eugene M., eds. (1979). Conway's All the World's Fighting Ships 1860–1905. Greenwich: Conway Maritime Press. ISBN 0-8317-0302-4.
- Corbett, Julian (1997). Naval Operations. History of the Great War: Based on Official Documents. Vol. II (reprint of the 1929 second ed.). London and Nashville, Tennessee: Imperial War Museum in association with the Battery Press. ISBN 1-870423-74-7.
- Corbett, Julian (1997). Naval Operations. History of the Great War: Based on Official Documents. Vol. III (reprint of the 1940 second ed.). London and Nashville, Tennessee: Imperial War Museum in association with the Battery Press. ISBN 1-870423-50-X.
- Friedman, Norman (2012). British Cruisers of the Victorian Era. Barnsley, South Yorkshire, UK: Seaforth. ISBN 978-1-59114-068-9.
- Friedman, Norman (2011). Naval Weapons of World War One. Barnsley, South Yorkshire, UK: Seaforth. ISBN 978-1-84832-100-7.
- Goldrick, James (1984). The King's Ships Were at Sea: The War in the North Sea August 1914 – February 1915. Annapolis, Maryland: Naval Institute Press. ISBN 0-87021-334-2.
- Heathcote, Tony (2002). The British Admirals of the Fleet 1734 – 1995. Barnsley, UK: Leo Cooper. ISBN 0-85052-835-6.
- Massie, Robert K. (2004). Castles of Steel: Britain, Germany, and the Winning of the Great War at Sea. London: Jonathan Cape. ISBN 0-224-04092-8.
- Newbolt, Henry (1996). Naval Operations. History of the Great War Based on Official Documents. Vol. IV (reprint of the 1928 ed.). Nashville, Tennessee: Battery Press. ISBN 0-89839-253-5.
- Newbolt, Henry (1996). Naval Operations. History of the Great War Based on Official Documents. Vol. V (reprint of the 1931 ed.). Nashville, Tennessee: Battery Press. ISBN 0-89839-255-1.
- Silverstone, Paul H. (1984). Directory of the World's Capital Ships. New York: Hippocrene Books. ISBN 0-88254-979-0.
- Ross, Stewart (1998). Admiral Sir Francis Bridgeman. Cambridge, UK: Baily's. ISBN 0-9523628-8-0.
- "Transcript: HMS DRAKE – June 1916 to August 1917, North America & West Indies Station, North Atlantic convoys". Royal Navy Log Books of the World War 1 Era. Naval-History.net.
- Wessex Archaeology (December 2006). "HMS Drake, Church Bay, Rathlin Island: Undesignated Site Assessment.pdf" (PDF). Wessex Archaeology Online. Salisbury, Wiltshire, UK: Wessex Archaeology.
