= Tirpitz =

Tirpitz may refer to:

== People ==
- Alfred von Tirpitz (1849–1930), German admiral
  - Tirpitz Plan, a plan for Germany to achieve world power status through naval power

== Ships ==
- German battleship Tirpitz, a World War II-era Bismarck-class battleship named after the admiral
- List of ships named Tirpitz

== Museums ==
- Tirpitz Museum (Denmark), focused on the Atlantic Wall in Denmark.
- Tirpitz Museum (Norway), focused on the battleship of same name.

== Other uses ==
- German coastal battery Tirpitz, a World War II artillery emplacement in Romania
- Tirpitz (pig), a pig rescued from the sinking of SMS Dresden and named after the admiral
- Tirpitz Range, a range of mountains on New Hanover and New Ireland islands
