= Postage stamps and postal history of the Falkland Islands Dependencies =

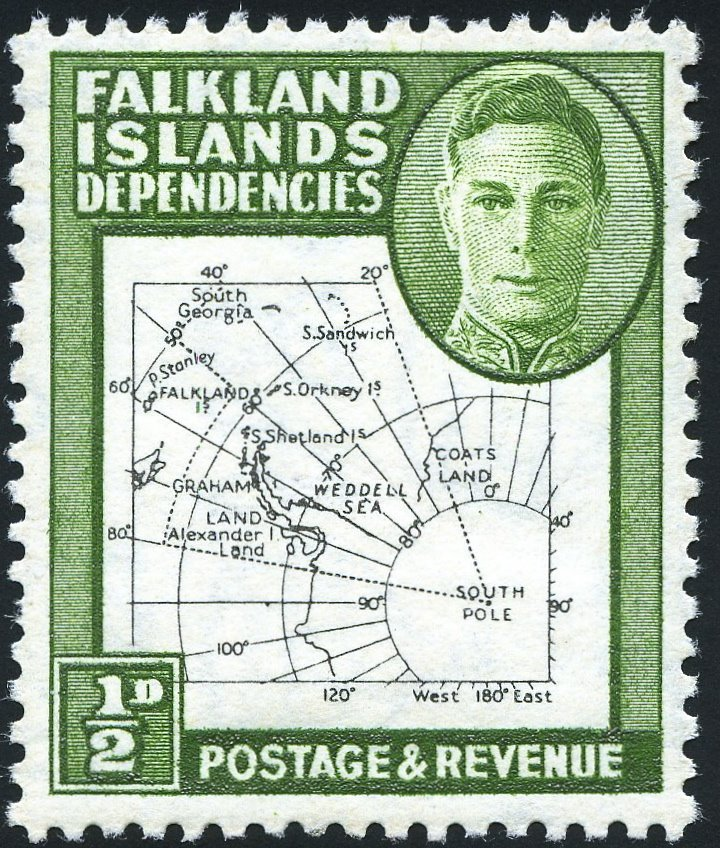
A 1946 stamp of the Falkland Islands Dependencies

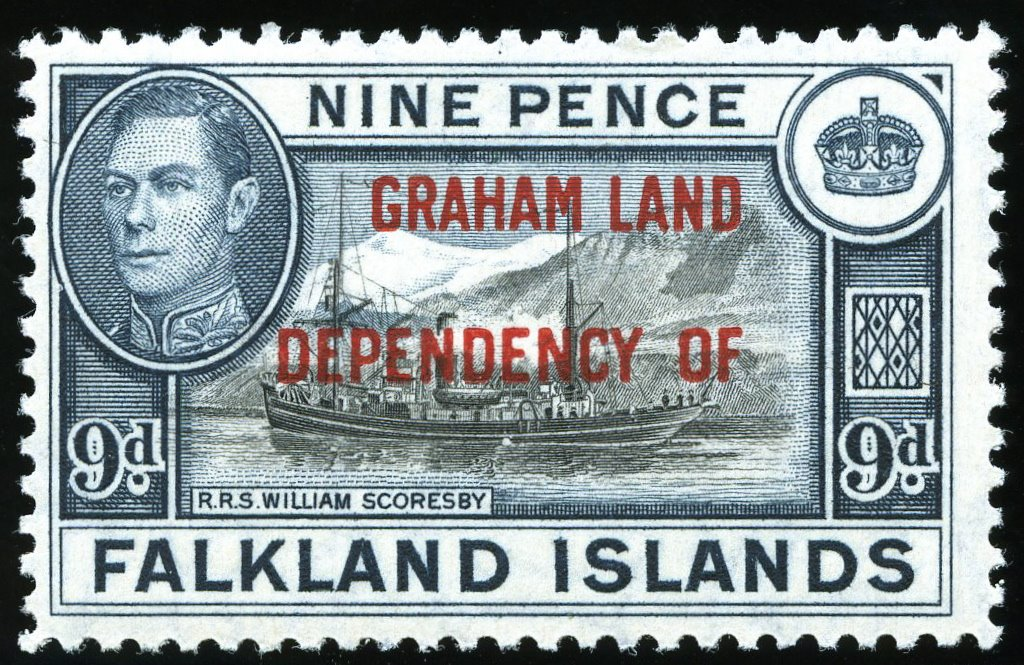
Stamp of the Falkland Islands overprinted for Graham Land, 1944

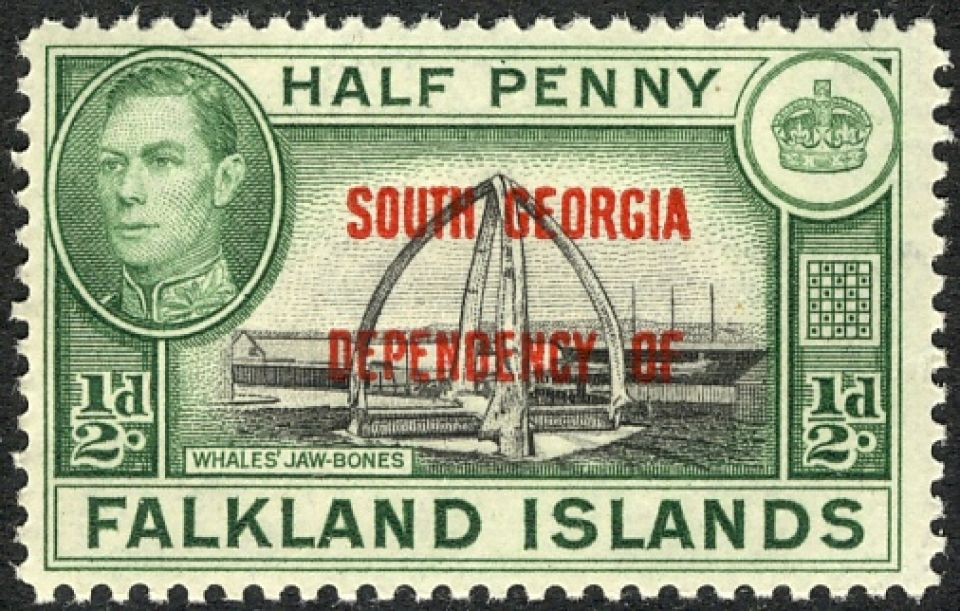
Stamp of the Falkland Islands overprinted for South Georgia, 1944

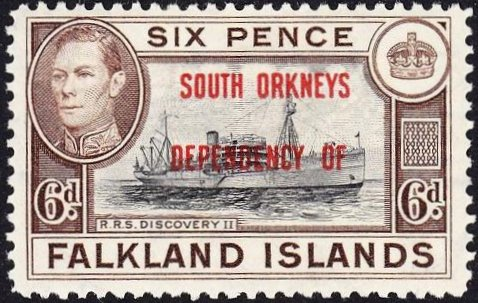
Stamp of the Falkland Islands overprinted for the South Orkneys

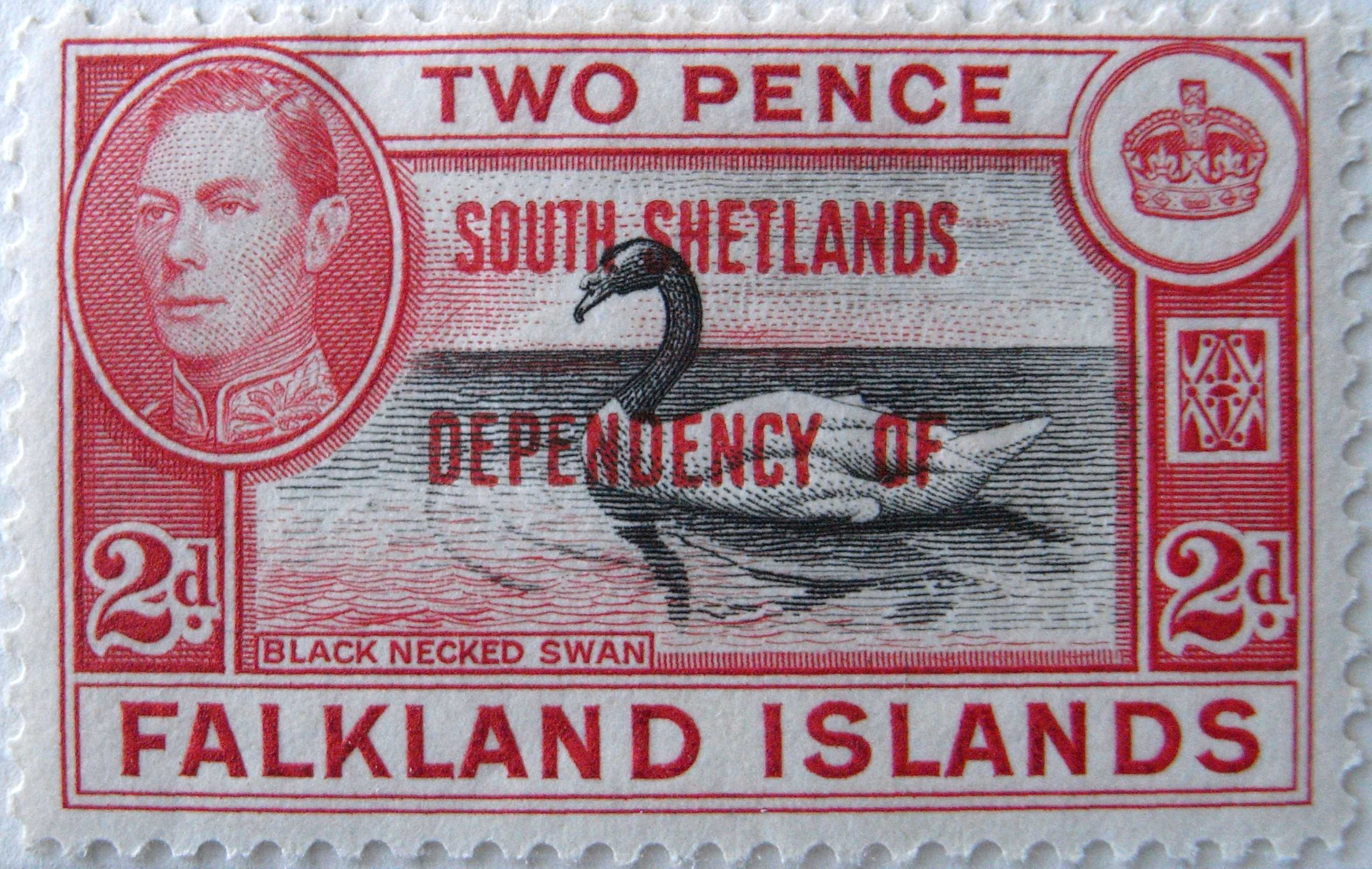
Stamp of the Falkland Islands overprinted for the South Shetlands

== First issues ==
The first stamps specifically for the Falkland Islands Dependencies were issued in 1944 and consisted of overprints on stamps of the Falkland Islands for Graham Land, South Georgia, the South Orkneys and the South Shetlands.

== Later issues ==
General issues inscribed "Falkland Islands Dependencies" were issued from 1946. In 1963, British Antarctic Territory was formed, leaving in the Dependencies only the island groups of South Georgia and the South Sandwich Islands which had stamps issued as "South Georgia".

Stamps of the Falkland Islands Dependencies were again issued in 1980, before being replaced by those of the newly formed territory of South Georgia and the South Sandwich Islands in 1985.

== See also ==
- Postage stamps and postal history of the Falkland Islands
- Postage stamps and postal history of South Georgia and the South Sandwich Islands
- Postage stamps and postal history of the British Antarctic Territory
