= Revenue stamps of the Falkland Islands =

Location of the Falkland Islands

The Falkland Islands issued very few revenue stamps, and did so between 1952 and 1996. The only special revenue stamps were for Old Age Pensions and Social Security. For other fiscal purposes, dual-purpose & revenue stamps were used.

== Old Age Pensions ==
The first Old Age Pensions stamp was the low values from the King George VI definitive set bisected and surcharged O.A.P. and a new value. These are very rare as probably very few were printed. From 1968 onwards a new design with the coat of arms of the colony was issued. This design was reprinted in decimal currency between 1971 and 1974, and some years later this issue was surcharged for new rates.

== Social Security ==
In 1953, stamps similar to the second Old Age Pensions issue but inscribed SOCIAL SECURITY were issued. These were in pre-decimal currency and four values of 3s, 4s6d, 5s and 7s6d are known to exist. Between 1979 and 1996, a number of values ranging from £3 to £14 were probably issued, although none have been recorded.

All Falkland Islands revenues are rare and highly sought after by collectors. Due to the small size of the islands, few were used and they are usually found in mint condition.

== See also ==
- Postage stamps and postal history of the Falkland Islands
