= Postage stamps and postal history of South Georgia and the South Sandwich Islands =

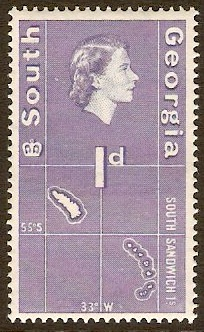
1963 stamp showing map of the islands

Until 1944 the British territory of South Georgia and the South Sandwich Islands used stamps issued for the Falkland Islands Dependencies. From 1944 stamps were overprinted with text indicating they were intended for use in the territory but the use of standard Falkland Islands Dependencies stamps resumed in 1946. From 1963 until 1980 specific stamps for the territory, marked "South Georgia", were issued, including a variety of special issues. From 1980 to 1985 Falkland Islands Dependencies stamps were issued. Since 1986 specific stamps have again been issued marked "South Georgia & South Sandwich Islands".

== Early stamps ==
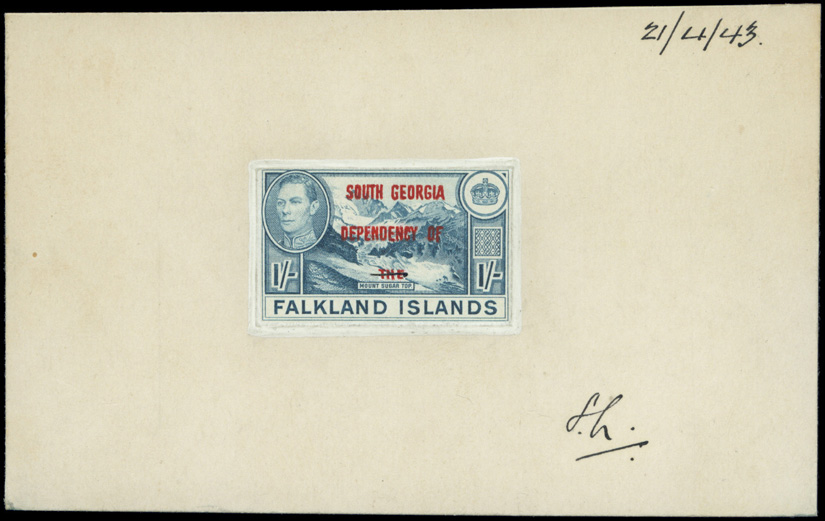
A 1943 die proof of a Falkland Islands stamp overprinted for use in South Georgia

Before 1944 the South Georgia and the South Sandwich Islands used stamps issued for the Falkland Islands Dependencies. A provisional stamp for the territory was designed in 1911, featuring a profile of George V. This was drawn up at the instigation of the resident magistrate and had the support of the governor of the dependencies but was not adopted. In 1923 a shortage of stamps led the acting magistrate to halve 2½ pence stamps for use as ad-hoc penny stamps.

The first stamps specifically for South Georgia were issued in 1944 and consisted of overprints on 1938 stamps of the Falkland Islands. This was when British military bases were established in the region as part of Operation Tabarin. Postal items were sent by the Falklands but the stamps were cancelled at the base of origin by postmark. Only denominations of ½, 1, 2, 3, 4, 6 and 9 pence and one shilling were overprinted, other stamps in the series of greater values or of 2½ pence were not overprinted but some were used. Three stamps in the series had images relating to South Georgia; the 6 pence stamp featured the RRS Discovery II; the 9 pence stamp featured the RRS William Scoresby and the one shilling stamp featured Mount Sugartop.

From 1946 to 1963, South Georgia used stamps of the Falkland Islands Dependencies but were cancelled with a South Georgia postmark. In 1963, the British Antarctic Territory was formed, leaving only the island groups of South Georgia and the South Sandwich Islands in the Falkland Islands Dependencies.

== Stamps marked "South Georgia" ==
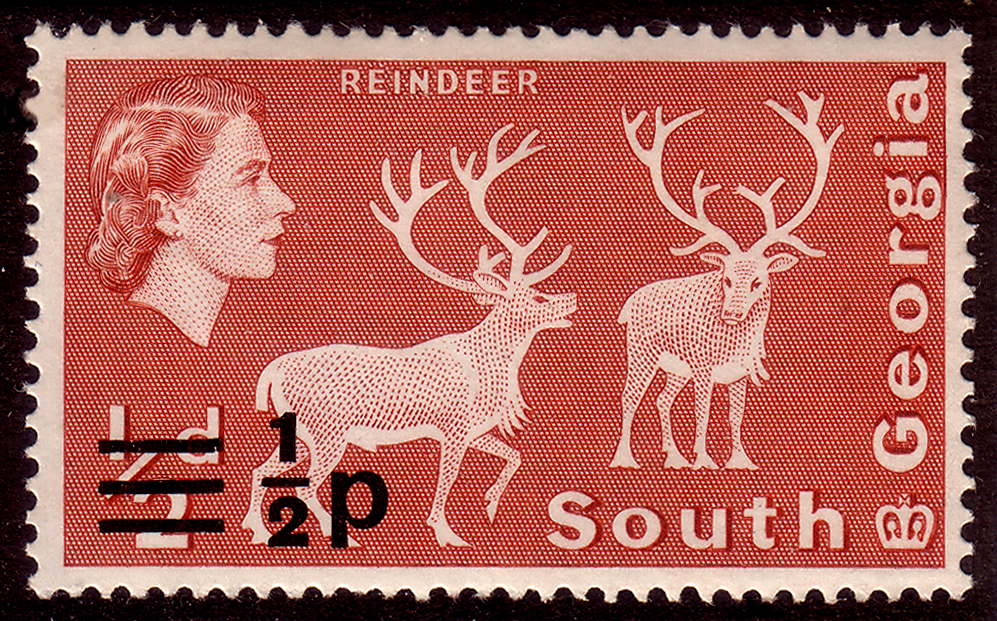
A ½ penny stamp overprinted after decimalisation

From 1963 to 1979, South Georgia had its own stamps simply marked South Georgia. There were 15 stamps in the series with values ranging from a halfpenny to one pound with most featuring local fauna; the one penny stamp featured a map of the territory and the two shilling stamp showed a memorial cross for Ernest Shackleton and Mount Paget. Stamps in these series, except for the one pound stamp, were overprinted in 1971 with their decimal-equivalent values.

A decimal issue was made in January 1972 in monochrome and was the last definitive set of British stamps to be made using the intaglio method. A special issue of four stamps was made in 1972 to commemorate the 50th anniversary of Shackleton's death. The 1½, 5, 10 and 20 pence stamps showed scenes from the 1914-1917 Imperial Trans-Antarctic Expedition. In November 1972 stamps of 5 and 10 pence value were issued to celebrate the silver wedding anniversary of Elizabeth II and Prince Philip. Both stamps showed the royal couple with an elephant seal and king penguins in an icy ocean. In 1972 the wedding of Anne, Princess Royal to Mark Phillips was marked with the issue of 5 and 15 pence stamps bearing their portraits. In 1974 the centenary of the birth of Winston Churchill was marked with stamps bearing his portrait on a background of the houses of parliament (for the 15 pence stamp) and of a battleship (for the 25 pence stamp). The Churchill stamps were the first of the territory to be issued on miniature sheets to appeal to collectors

In 1975 an issue of three stamps were produced to commemorate the exploration of the island group by Captain James Cook during his second voyage. These were in 2, 8 and 16 pence values showing Cook, HMS Resolution and Possession Bay respectively. In 1976 a series of four stamps were issued to commemorate the 50th anniversary of the arrival of the Discovery Investigations on the islands. These were issued in 2, 8, 11 and 25 pence values and depicted ships of the expedition and its land-based laboratory. The Silver Jubilee of Elizabeth II was marked in 1977 with two issues of stamps. The first 6, 11 and 33 pence stamps marked the anniversary of the queen's accession and showed Prince Philip during his 1957 visit to South Georgia and scenes from Elizabeth's coronation. The second marked the anniversary of the coronation and were issued in three designs of 25 pence value (a portrait of Elizabeth II, an elephant seal and a heraldric animal); very few saw use. Another issue marked the 200th anniversary of Cook's voyages and his 1779 death. The stamps (3, 6, 11 and 25 pence) were very large and impractical for use on smaller items. They depicted Resolution, a chart of Cook's visit to the territory, a king penguin and a portrait of Cook.

== Post-1980 stamps ==
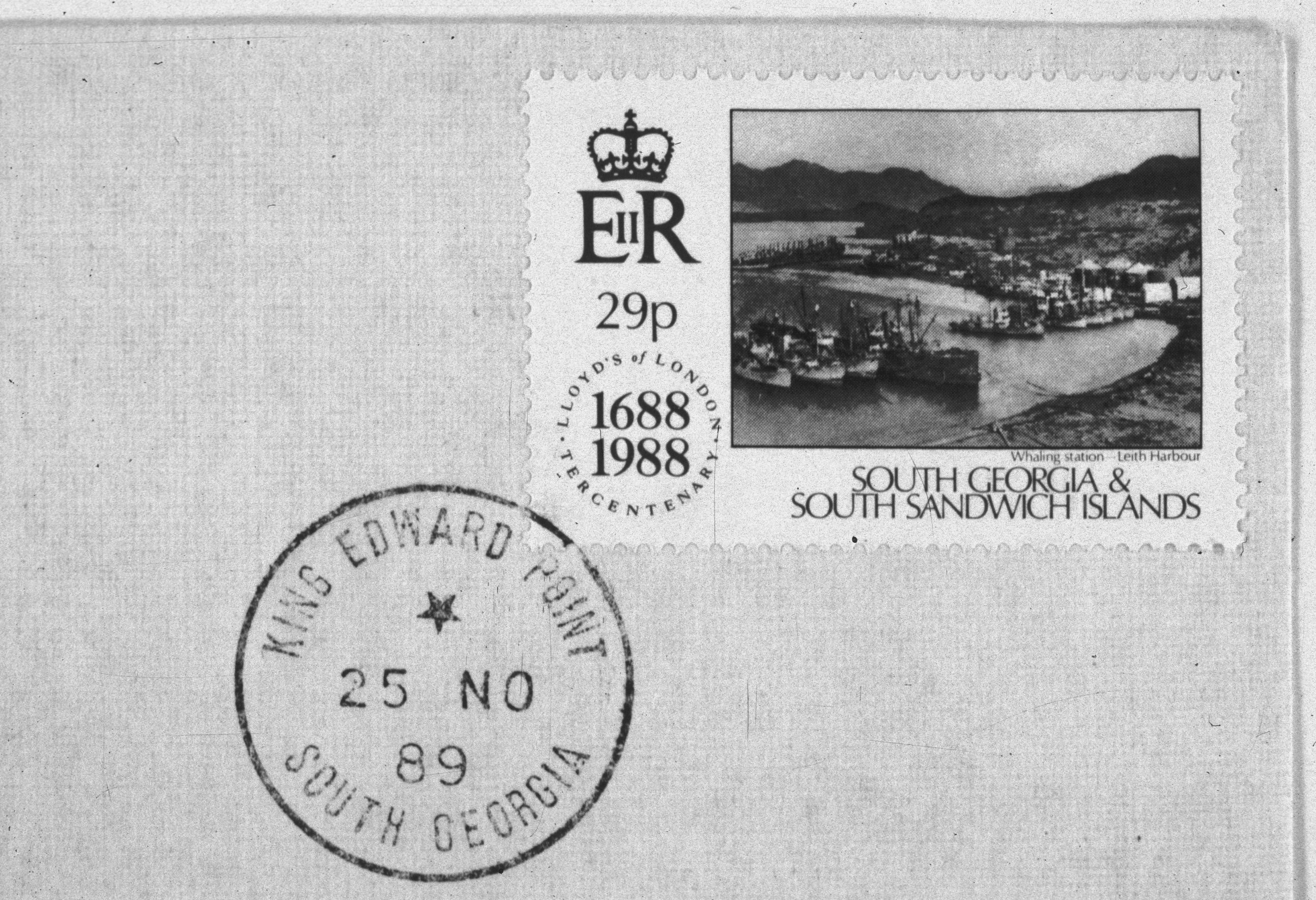
A 1989 29 pence stamp

From 1980 to 1985, South Georgia again used stamps of the Falkland Islands Dependencies. Some of these stamps featured South Georgia-related images.. From 1986, stamps of the territory are inscribed South Georgia & South Sandwich Islands.

As of 2007, the territory is one of only two sub-Antarctic island groups to issue its own stamps (the other is the French Southern and Antarctic Lands), although most operate post offices.

== See also ==
- Postage stamps and postal history of the Falkland Islands
- Postage stamps and postal history of the Falkland Islands Dependencies
