= HMS Glasgow error =

Falkland Islands postage stamp with design error

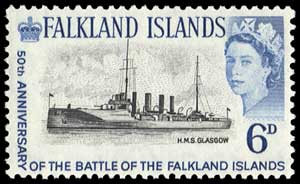
- Date of production: 1964
- Commemorates: Battle of the Falkland Islands
- Depicts: HMS Glasgow
- Nature of rarity: Design error
- No. in existence: 17
- Face value: 6d
- Estimated value: CHF 29,000

The HMS Glasgow error is a 6d postage stamp error produced by the Falkland Islands in 1964. It commemorates the 50th anniversary of the 1914 Battle of the Falkland Islands.

The error featured the incorrect ship, HMS Glasgow, instead of HMS Kent, which should have been used. Apparently one sheet was sent to a stamp dealer in the United States who did not notice the mistake. It is believed that only the one sheet of 60 stamps was produced; only 17 stamps have been recorded.

A single stamp from the collection of Sir Gawaine Baillie was sold in 2004 for £24,000, and another example was sold in May 2005 for CHF 29,000. In December 2006, a marginal example sold for £30,555.

== See also ==
- List of notable postage stamps
- Postage stamps and postal history of the Falkland Islands
