= Postage stamps and postal history of the Falkland Islands =

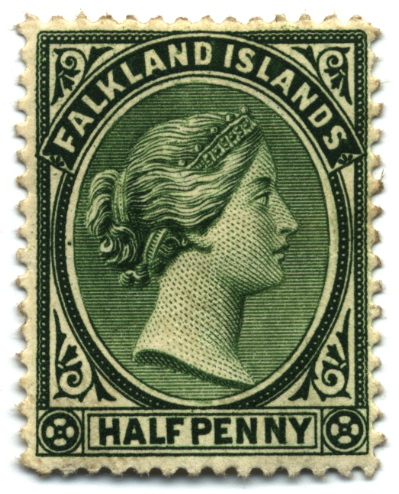
Halfpenny stamp, 1891

This is a survey of the postage stamps and postal history of the Falkland Islands.

== Early mails ==
Early mail service depended on occasional calls by ships connecting to the Brazil packet via Montevideo; the earliest recorded letter dates from 15 February 1800. From 1852 to 1880 a schooner (either a government boat or a contractor) called about every two months.

In October 1877, the Secretary of State of the Colonial Office, the Earl of Carnarvon began the process of application for the Falkland Islands to join the General Postal Union (renamed Universal Postal Union in 1879). No sooner than the Falklands had joined the GPU; an announcement was made that the postage rates would be reduced from 6d per ½ ounce to 4d per ½ ounce.

Before 17 July 1861 postage costs could not be prepaid, and from 1869 prepaid franks are known, used by the local postmaster.

== First stamps ==
The first stamps, 1d and 6d values featuring the profile of Queen Victoria, were issued 19 June 1878. Unusually for a British colony, the first stamps were not on watermarked paper, but this was rectified in 1883. Additional values of this design appeared from time to time until 1902.

In 1880, carriage of mail was made mandatory for any ship calling at Stanley, and regular service was contracted to the German Kosmos Line, which operated steamships on a route from Hamburg to Callao, Peru. The first post office opened in Stanley in 1887.

On 1 January 1891 a need for 1/2d stamps resulted in the authorization of bisection and surcharge of existing 1d stamps. 1/2d stamps arrived in September, but the bisects were allowed until 11 January 1892.

== The twentieth century ==
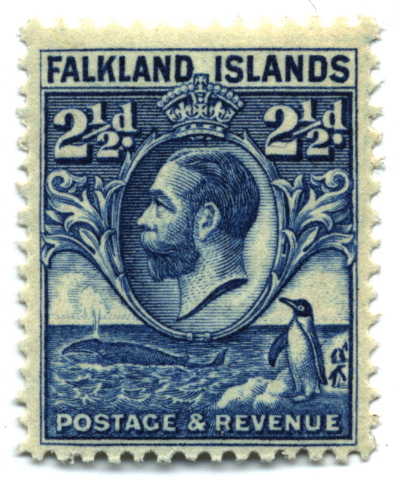
A 2 1/2d stamp of 1929

In 1900, the Pacific Steam Navigation Company got the contract, which operated until 1914, when the opening of the Panama Canal made Cape Horn roundings unnecessary, and regular mail service to the Falklands was not resumed until 1927.

In 1904 new stamps of the same general design, but depicting Edward VII, were issued, and likewise after 1912 for George V. Shortages of dyes due to World War I led to considerable color variations in the wartime printings of George V stamps.

The 2d purple stamp was surcharged 2 1/2d in 1928 for use on the island of South Georgia only during a stamp shortage.

In 1929 the first pictorial design appeared, featuring small images of a whale and penguins beneath the profile of George V. This was followed up by the much-admired centennial issue of 1933, a series of 12 stamps featuring local scenes and wildlife evocatively rendered; a full set is today priced at about US$3,000.

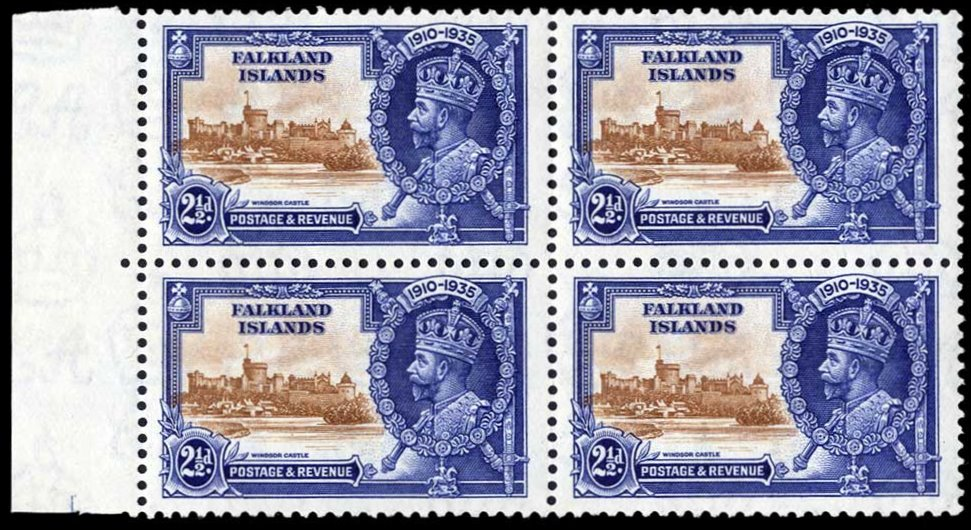
1935 Silver Jubilee stamps of the Falkland Islands

Starting in the 1930s, the Falklands took part of the omnibus issues of the Empire; the Silver Jubilee issue of 1935, Coronation issue for George VI in 1937, and so forth. The new king also meant a need for a new definitive series, which came out in 1938 and featured scenes, wildlife, and ships, though in a somewhat plainer design than the pictorials of 1933.

A last definitive series for George VI appeared in 1952. Of the 14 stamps of the issue, six were re-issued between 1955 and 1957 with a portrait of Elizabeth II. The next definitive series did not come out until 1960, the 15 values depicting various native birds.

In 1964, a series of four stamps commemorating the 50th anniversary of the Battle of the Falkland Islands became notable for the HMS Glasgow error, in which the wrong warship was printed on a few of the six-pence value.

== The Falklands War ==
During the Falklands War of 1982, occupied islands used stamps of Argentina, and postmarks with the wording "Islas Malvinas". Since that time, a British garrison has been maintained; while forces mail to home is free, mail to other destinations requires postage franked with British stamps, and as of 2003 was cancelled with two intertwined circles saying "Falkland Islands BFPO 655 Post Office".

== Post codes ==
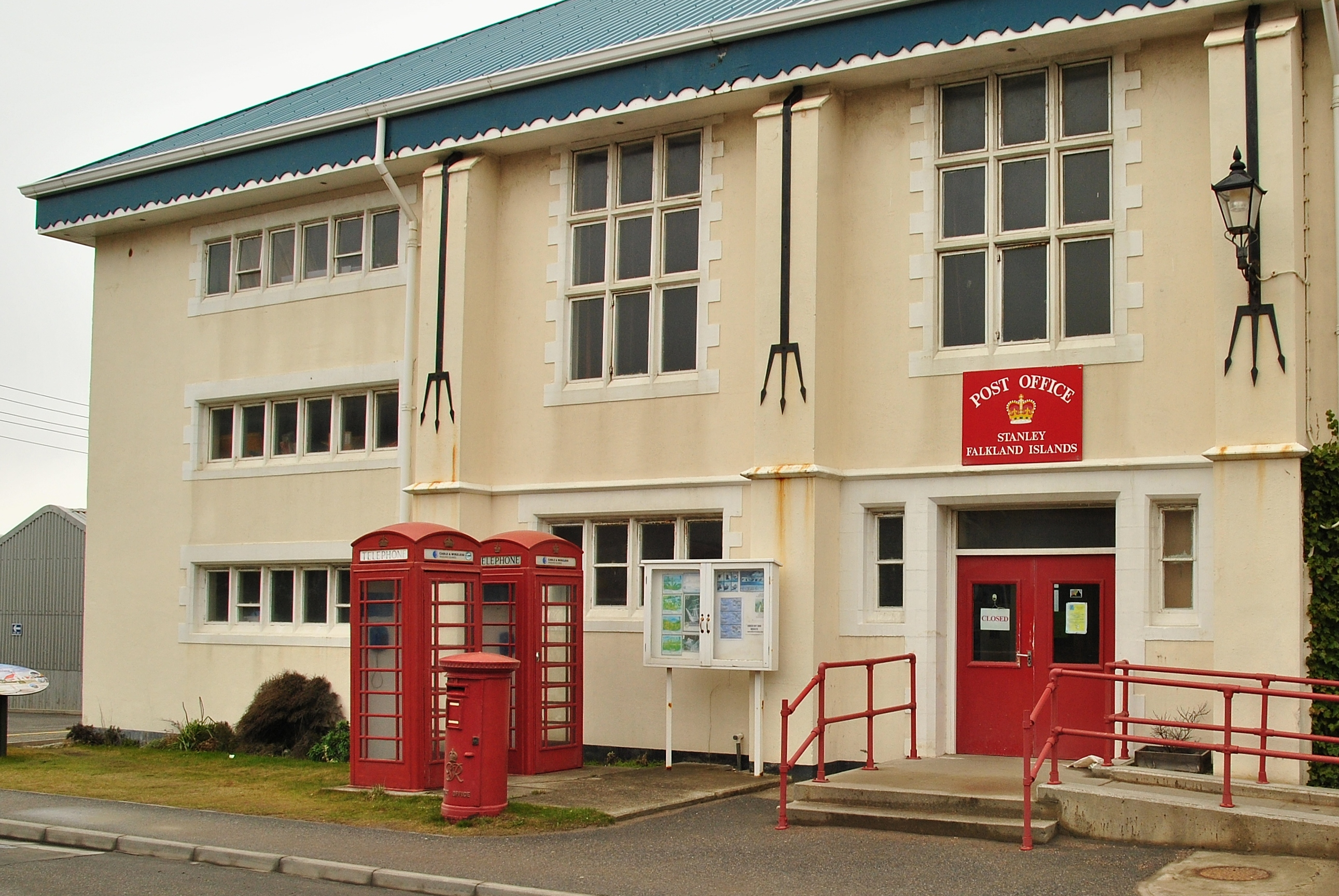
Stanley Post Office

In 2003, the Islands were given their own UK postcode, FIQQ 1ZZ. This was in response to complaints that mail to the Falklands was being sent to the wrong destination (usually either Falkland in Fife, where postcodes have the letters 'FK', or to the Faroe Islands). The introduction of the postcode, valid for all local addresses, also helped Islanders to fill in mail order forms online, many of which insisted on a valid ZIP or postal code.

== Privatisation ==
On 1 August 2014 the Falkland Islands postal and philatelic bureau services were privatised by a decision of the Falkland Islands Government as the Falklands Post Service Ltd.

== See also ==
- HMS Glasgow error
- Maude Carey
- Postage stamps and postal history of the Falkland Islands Dependencies
- Postage stamps and postal history of South Georgia and the South Sandwich Islands
- Revenue stamps of the Falkland Islands

== Sources ==
- Stanley Gibbons Ltd: various catalogues
- AskPhil – Glossary of Stamp Collecting Terms
- Encyclopaedia of Postal History
- Upland Goose, newsletter of the Falkland Islands Philatelic Study Group
- Stuart Rossiter & John Fowler (1991). World History Stamp Atlas (reprint ed.). pub: Black Cat. ISBN 0-7481-0309-0.
- "Specialised Stamp Catalogue of the Falkland Islands and Dependencies 1800-2013", author Stefan Heijtz, ISBN 978-91-637-2341-4
