= Tirpitz (pig) =

WWI naval mascot

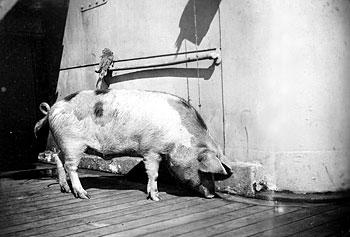
Tirpitz aboard HMS Glasgow

Tirpitz was a pig captured from the Imperial German Navy after a naval skirmish (the Battle of Más a Tierra) following the Battle of the Falkland Islands in 1915. She became the mascot of the cruiser HMS Glasgow.

== Early life ==
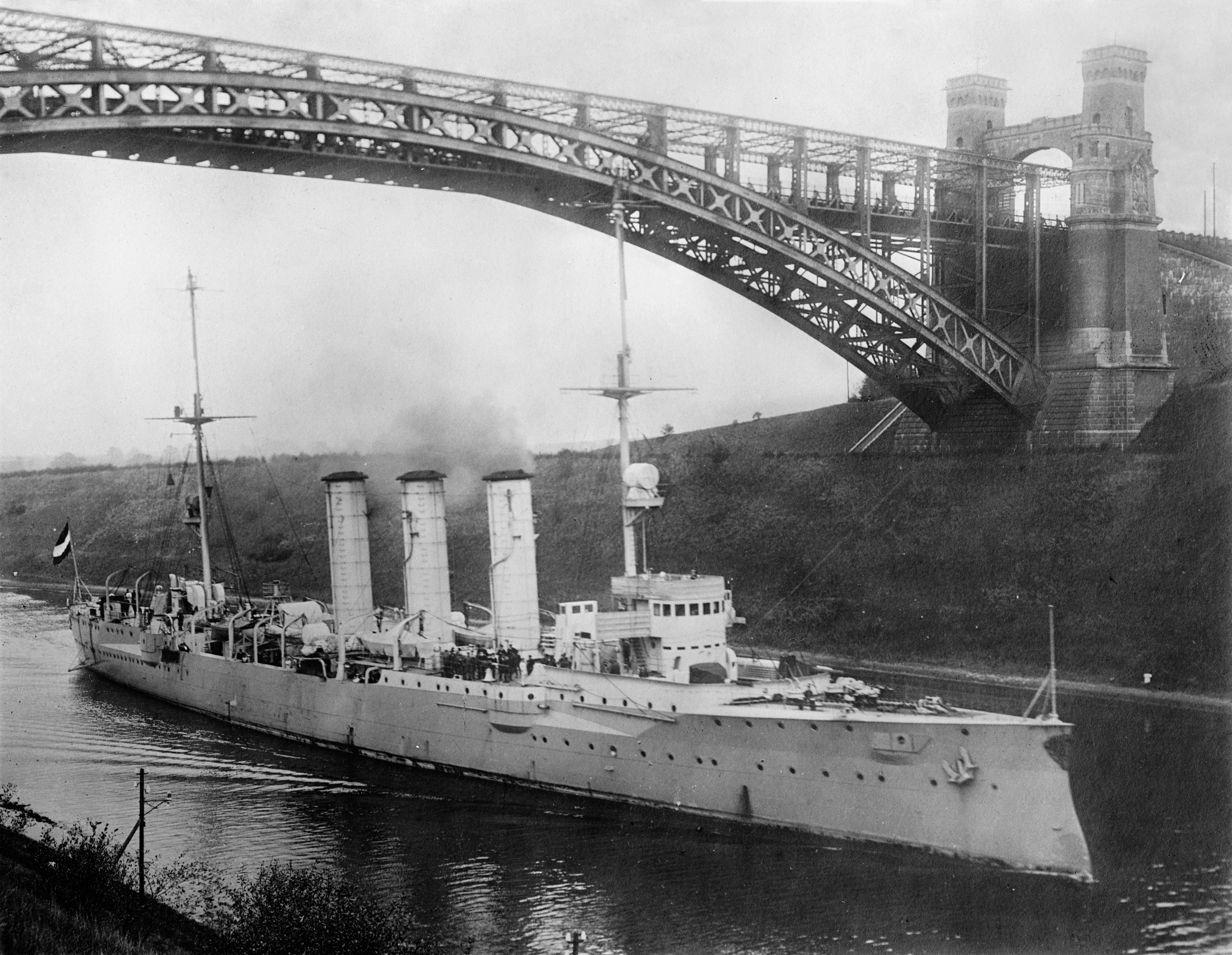
Tirpitz's first home, SMS Dresden

Pigs were often kept on board warships to supply fresh meat. Tirpitz was aboard SMS Dresden, when she was ordered into the South Atlantic to join with the forces of Vice Admiral Maximilian von Spee to raid Allied merchants. The ship's first encounter with HMS Glasgow was at the Battle of Coronel, where the German fleet was victorious. They were later defeated at the Battle of the Falkland Islands, though the faster Dresden managed to escape. She was located in Cumberland Bay on the Chilean island of Más a Tierra (today known as Robinson Crusoe Island), by HMS Glasgow and HMS Kent off the coast of South America on 15 March 1915. The Germans scuttled the ship, but Tirpitz was left on board as she sank.

== Capture and Royal Navy service ==
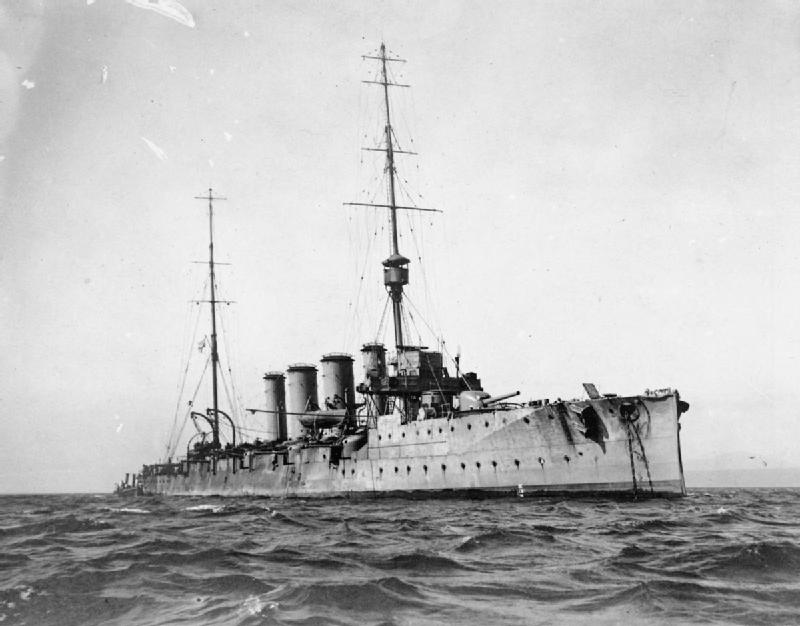
Tirpitz's second home, HMS Glasgow

Tirpitz was able to make her way above deck and swim clear of the sinking Dresden. She struck out for the nearby Royal Navy ships and was spotted an hour later by a petty officer aboard HMS Glasgow. The officer entered the water, but the frightened Tirpitz nearly drowned him. He was however eventually able to rescue the pig and bring her aboard. The animal was adopted by the crew of HMS Glasgow, who made her their mascot, and named her 'Tirpitz', after Alfred von Tirpitz, the German Admiral, and Secretary of State of the Imperial Naval Office. Tirpitz remained with the Glasgow for a year and was then placed in quarantine until she was allowed to be adopted by the Petty Officer who had first seen her, who transferred her to Whale Island Gunnery School, Portsmouth for the rest of her career. The Times newspaper reported:

The animal, which is known as 'Tirpitz', was once owned by the German light cruiser Dresden, and when, during the action with Glasgow, Kent, and Orama, the Germans escaped to the shore after causing an explosion which sank the Dresden, and 'Tirpitz' was left to its fate, the pig struck out boldly, and was seen swimming near the Glasgow. Two sailors dived into the sea, and the animal was brought safely aboard. The ship's company of the Glasgow awarded 'Tirpitz' an 'Iron Cross' for having remained in the ship after its shipmates had left, and it became a great pet.

== As a fundraiser ==
Tirpitz was eventually auctioned off for charity as pork in 1919. She ultimately raised £1,785 for the British Red Cross. Tirpitz was bought by William Cavendish-Bentinck, 6th Duke of Portland, who donated Tirpitz's stuffed head to the Imperial War Museum. Tirpitz's head was put on display as part of the museum's original exhibition at The Crystal Palace in 1920, and also featured in the museum's 2006 temporary exhibition 'The Animals' War'.

Another of Tirpitz's legacies was bequeathed to the next HMS Glasgow, which retained a pair of silver mounted carvers made from Tirpitz's trotters. These carvers were later also acquired by the Imperial War Museum.

== See also ==
- List of individual pigs
