= List of ships named Tirpitz =

A number of ships have been named Tirpitz or Admiral von Tirpitz, after the German admiral Alfred von Tirpitz, including the following:

== Naval vessels ==
- German naval trawler Grossadmiral von Tirpitz, launched 1916
- German battleship Tirpitz, a World War II-era Bismarck-class battleship

== Merchant ships ==
- Admiral von Tirpitz (1905), a passenger-cargo vessel of Hamburg-America Line
- Tirpitz (1913), an ocean liner completed in 1919 (launched 1913 as Admiral von Tirpitz for Hamburg-America Line), but better known as Empress of Australia
- Tirpitz (1921), a cargo liner of Hamburg America Line, lost by mine in 1941
